= UnxUtils =

Collection of GNU utilities ported to Windows

- Last updated: 24 April 2013; 12 years ago
- Operating system: Microsoft Windows
- Licence: Free software
- Website: sourceforge.net/projects/unxutils/
- Development status: Unmaintained
- As of: August 2015

UnxUtils is a collection of utility programs that provide popular Unix-based shell commands – ported from GNU implementations as native Windows programs that depend only on Win32 and the Microsoft C-runtime (msvcrt.dll). The collection was last updated externally on April 15, 2003, by Karl M. Syring. As of December 2016, the most recent release was an open-source project at SourceForge, with the latest binary release in March, 2007 (though the files are dated 2000). The independent distribution included a main zip archive (UnxUtils.zip, 3,365,638 bytes) complemented by more recent updates (UnxUpdates.zip, 878,847 bytes, brought some binaries up to year 2003), but the SourceForge project has no UnxUpdates.zip package.

An alternative collection of Unix-based utilities for Windows is GnuWin32. It has later versions of many programs, but requires supporting files (e.g. DLLs).

Supported commands include:

- agrep
- ansi2knr
- basename
- bc
- bison
- bunzip2
- bzip2
- bzip2recover
- cat
- chgrp
- chmod
- chown
- cksum
- cmp
- comm
- compress
- cp
- csplit
- cut
- date
- dc
- dd
- df
- diff
- diff3
- dircolors
- dirname
- du
- echo
- egrep
- env
- expand
- expr
- factor
- fgrep
- find
- flex
- fmt
- fold
- fsplit
- gawk
- gclip
- gplay
- grep
- gsar
- gunzip
- gzip
- head
- id
- indent
- install
- join
- jwhois
- less
- lesskey
- ln
- logname
- ls
- m4
- make
- makedepend
- makemsg
- man
- md5sum
- mkdir
- mkfifo
- mknod
- mv
- mvdir
- nl
- od
- paste
- patch
- pathchk
- pclip
- pr
- printenv
- printf
- ptx
- pwd
- recode
- rm
- rman
- rmdir
- sdiff
- sed
- seq
- sh
- sha1sum
- shar
- sleep
- sort
- split
- stego
- su
- sum
- sync
- tac
- tail
- tar
- tee
- test
- touch
- tr
- tsort
- type
- uname
- unexpand
- uniq
- unrar
- unshar
- unzip
- uudecode
- uuencode
- wc
- wget
- which
- whoami
- xargs
- yes
- zcat
- zip
- zsh

== See also ==
- Cygwin – Unix-like environment for Windows
- GNU Core Utilities – Collection of standard, Unix-based utilities from GNU
- GnuWin32 – Discontinued implementation of the GNU toolchain for Windows
- Interix – Unix subsystem for Windows NT operating systems
- List of POSIX commands
- MinGW – Free and open-source software for developing applications in Microsoft Windows
- MKS Toolkit
- Windows Services for UNIX – Discontinued software produced by Microsoft which provided Unix environment on Windows NT
