= Xargs =

Standard UNIX utility

xargs
- Developers: Various open-source and commercial developers
- Operating system: Unix, Unix-like, Plan 9, IBM i
- Platform: Cross-platform
- Type: Command

xargs (short for "extended arguments") is a command on Unix and most Unix-like operating systems used to build and execute commands from standard input. It converts input from standard input into arguments to a command.

Some commands such as grep and awk can take input either as command-line arguments or from the standard input. However, others such as cp and echo can only take input in the form of arguments, which is why xargs is necessary.

A port of an older version of GNU xargs is available for Microsoft Windows as part of the UnxUtils collection of native Win32 ports of common GNU Unix-like utilities. A ground-up rewrite named wargs is part of the open-source TextTools project. The xargs command has also been ported to the IBM i operating system.

== Examples ==
One use case of the xargs command is to remove a list of files using the rm command. POSIX systems have an ARG_MAX for the maximum total length of the command line, so the command may fail with an error message of "Argument list too long" (meaning that the exec system call's limit on the length of a command line was exceeded): rm /path/* or rm $(find /path -type f). (The latter invocation is incorrect, as it may expand globs in the output.)

This can be rewritten using the xargs command to break the list of arguments into sublists small enough to be acceptable:

$ find /path -type f -print | xargs rm

In the above example, the find utility feeds the input of xargs with a long list of file names. xargs then splits this list into sublists and calls rm once for every sublist.

Some implementations of xargs can also be used to parallelize operations with the -P maxprocs argument to specify how many parallel processes should be used to execute the commands over the input argument lists. However, the output streams may not be synchronized. This can be overcome by using an --output file argument where possible, and then combining the results after processing. The following example queues 24 processes and waits on each to finish before launching another.

$ find /path -name '*.foo' | xargs -P 24 -I '{}' /cpu/bound/process '{}' -o '{}'.out

xargs often covers the same functionality as the command substitution feature of many shells, denoted by the backquote notation (`...` or $(...)). xargs is also a good companion for commands that output long lists of files such as find, locate and grep, but only if one uses -0 (or equivalently --null), since xargs without -0 deals badly with file names containing ', " and space. GNU Parallel is a similar tool that offers better compatibility with find, locate and grep when file names may contain ', ", and space (newline still requires -0).

== Placement of arguments ==
=== -I option: single argument ===
The xargs command offers options to insert the listed arguments at some position other than the end of the command line. The -I option to xargs takes a string that will be replaced with the supplied input before the command is executed. A common choice is %.

$ mkdir ~/backups
$ find /path -type f -name '*~' -print0 | xargs -0 -I % cp -a % ~/backups

The string to replace may appear multiple times in the command part. Using -I at all limits the number of lines used each time to one.

=== Shell trick: any number ===
Another way to achieve a similar effect is to use a shell as the launched command, and deal with the complexity in that shell, for example:

$ mkdir ~/backups
$ find /path -type f -name '*~' -print0 | xargs -0 sh -c 'for filename; do cp -a "$filename" ~/backups; done' sh

The word sh at the end of the line is for the POSIX shell sh -c to fill in for $0, the "executable name" part of the positional parameters (argv). If it weren't present, the name of the first matched file would be instead assigned to $0 and the file wouldn't be copied to ~/backups. One can also use any other word to fill in that blank, my-xargs-script for example.

Since cp accepts multiple files at once, one can also simply do the following:

$ find /path -type f -name '*~' -print0 | xargs -0 sh -c 'if [ $# -gt 0 ]; then cp -a "$@" ~/backup; fi' sh

This script runs cp with all the files given to it when there are any arguments passed. Doing so is more efficient since only one invocation of cp is done for each invocation of sh.

== Separator problem ==
Many Unix utilities are line-oriented. These may work with xargs as long as the lines do not contain ', ", or a space. Some of the Unix utilities can use NUL as record separator (e.g. Perl (requires -0 and \0 instead of \n), locate (requires using -0), find (requires using -print0), grep (requires -z or -Z), sort (requires using -z)). Using -0 for xargs deals with the problem, but many Unix utilities cannot use NUL as separator (e.g. head, tail, ls, echo, sed, tar -v, wc, which).

But often people forget this and assume xargs is also line-oriented, which is not the case (per default xargs separates on newlines and blanks within lines, substrings with blanks must be single- or double-quoted).

The separator problem is illustrated here:

# Make some targets to practice on
touch important_file
touch 'not important_file'
mkdir -p '12" records'

find . -name not\* | tail -1 | xargs rm
find \! -name . -type d | tail -1 | xargs rmdir

Running the above will cause important_file to be removed but will remove neither the directory called 12" records, nor the file called not important_file.

The proper fix is to use the GNU-specific -print0 option, but tail (and other tools) do not support NUL-terminated strings:

# use the same preparation commands as above
find . -name not\* -print0 | xargs -0 rm
find \! -name . -type d -print0 | xargs -0 rmdir

When using the -print0 option, entries are separated by a null character instead of an end-of-line. This is equivalent to the more verbose command:find . -name not\* | tr \\n \\0 | xargs -0 rm or shorter, by switching xargs to (non-POSIX) line-oriented mode with the -d (delimiter) option: find . -name not\* | xargs -d '\n' rm

but in general using -0 with -print0 should be preferred, since newlines in filenames are still a problem.

GNU parallel is an alternative to xargs that is designed to have the same options, but is line-oriented. Thus, using GNU Parallel instead, the above would work as expected.

For Unix environments where xargs does not support the -0 nor the -d option (e.g. Solaris, AIX), the POSIX standard states that one can simply backslash-escape every character:find . -name not\* | sed 's/\(.\)/\\\1/g' | xargs rm. Alternatively, one can avoid using xargs at all, either by using GNU parallel or using the -exec ... + functionality of find.

== Operating on a subset of arguments at a time ==
One might be dealing with commands that can only accept one or maybe two arguments at a time. For example, the diff command operates on two files at a time. The -n option to xargs specifies how many arguments at a time to supply to the given command. The command will be invoked repeatedly until all input is exhausted. Note that on the last invocation one might get fewer than the desired number of arguments if there is insufficient input. Use xargs to break up the input into two arguments per line:

$ echo {0..9} | xargs -n 2
0 1
2 3
4 5
6 7
8 9

In addition to running based on a specified number of arguments at a time, one can also invoke a command for each line of input with the -L 1 option. One can use an arbitrary number of lines at a time, but one is most common. Here is how one might diff every git commit against its parent.

$ git log --format="%H %P" | xargs -L 1 git diff

== Encoding problem ==
The argument separator processing of xargs is not the only problem with using the xargs program in its default mode. Most Unix tools which are often used to manipulate filenames (for example sed, basename, sort, etc.) are text processing tools. However, Unix path names are not really text. Consider a path name /aaa/bbb/ccc. The /aaa directory and its bbb subdirectory can in general be created by different users with different environments. That means these users could have a different locale setup, and that means that aaa and bbb do not even necessarily have to have the same character encoding. For example, aaa could be in UTF-8 and bbb in Shift JIS. As a result, an absolute path name in a Unix system may not be correctly processable as text under a single character encoding. Tools which rely on their input being text may fail on such strings.

One workaround for this problem is to run such tools in the C locale, which essentially processes the bytes of the input as-is. However, this will change the behavior of the tools in ways the user may not expect (for example, some of the user's expectations about case-folding behavior may not be met).
