= Whoami =

Command on various operating systems

whoami
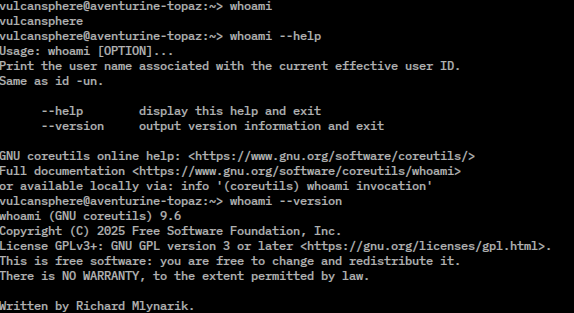
- coreutils whoami command
- Developer(s): Bill Joy, Richard Mlynarik, Intel, Microsoft, ReactOS Contributors, Novell
- Operating system: Unix, Unix-like, iRMX 86, Windows, ReactOS, NetWare
- Platform: Cross-platform
- Type: Command
- License: BSD: BSD License coreutils: GPLv3 iRMX 86, Windows, NetWare: Proprietary commercial software ReactOS: GPLv2

In computing, whoami is a command found on most Unix-like operating systems, Intel iRMX 86, every Microsoft Windows operating system since Windows Server 2003, and on ReactOS. It is a concatenation of the words "Who am I?" and prints the effective username of the current user when invoked.

== Overview ==
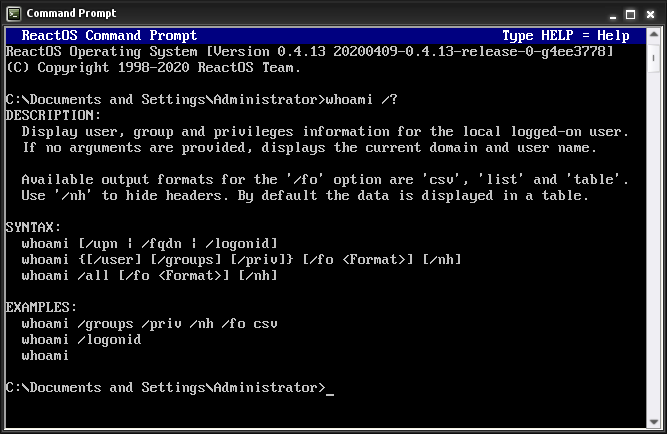
The ReactOS whoami command

The command has the same effect as the Unix command id -un. On Unix-like operating systems, the output of the command is slightly different from $USER because whoami outputs the username that the user is working under, whereas $USER outputs the username that was used to log in. For example, if the user logged in as John and su into root, whoami displays root and echo $USER displays John. This is because the su command does not invoke a login shell by default.

The earliest versions were created in 2.9 BSD as a convenience form for who am i, the Berkeley Unix who command's way of printing just the logged in user's identity. This version was developed by Bill Joy.

The GNU version was written by Richard Mlynarik and is part of the GNU Core Utilities (coreutils).

The command is available as a separate package for Microsoft Windows as part of the GnuWin32 project and the UnxUtils collection of native Win32 ports of common GNU Unix-like utilities.

On Intel iRMX 86 this command lists the currents user's identification and access rights.

The command is also available as part of the Windows 2000 Resource Kit and Windows XP SP2 Support Tools.

The ReactOS version was developed by Ismael Ferreras Morezuelas and is licensed under the GPLv2.

This command was also available as a NetWare-Command residing in the public-directory of the fileserver. It also outputs the current connections to which server the workstation is attached with which username.

== Example ==
=== Unix, Unix-like ===
# whoami
root

=== Intel iRMX 86 ===
--WHOAMI
USER ID: 5
ACCESS ID'S: 5, WORLD

=== Windows, ReactOS ===
C:\Users\admin>whoami
workgroup\admin

== See also ==
- logname
- id
- who
- User identifiers for Unix
- List of Unix commands
