= SEQ =

SEQ or seq may refer to:

- Sequence (disambiguation), a word commonly abbreviated as "seq."
- South East Queensland, a place in Australia
- Seq, Iran, a village in Hormozgan Province, Iran
- SEQ, the former callsign of a TV station in Maryborough, Queensland, Australia
- ShowEQ, a protocol analyzer for the video game, EverQuest.
- seq (Unix), a program in the GNU Core Utilities and Plan 9 from Bell Labs that outputs a sequence of numbers
- Schrödinger equation, a defining equation of quantum mechanics
- Sequence data (or .seq), a file that stores MIDI sequences that are compatible with sound cards integrated into the Sony PlayStation
