= Nl (Unix) =

Unix command

nl
- Operating system: Unix and Unix-like
- Platform: Cross-platform
- Type: Command
- License: coreutils: GPLv3+

nl is a Unix utility for numbering lines, either from a file or from standard input, reproducing output on standard output.

== History ==
nl is part of the X/Open Portability Guide since issue 2 of 1987. It was inherited into the first version of POSIX.1 and the Single Unix Specification. It first appeared in System V release 2.

The version of nl bundled in GNU coreutils was written by Scott Bartram and David MacKenzie.

The command is available as a separate package for Microsoft Windows as part of the UnxUtils collection of native Win32 ports of common GNU Unix-like utilities.

== Syntax ==
The command has a number of switches:

- a - number all lines
- t - number lines with printable text only
- n - no line numbering
- pstring - number only those lines containing the regular expression defined in the string supplied.

The default applied switch is t.

nl also supports some command line options.

== Example ==
 $ nl tf
     1  echo press cr
     2  read cr
     3  done

The following example numbers only the lines that begin with a capital letter A (matching on the regular expression /^A/). filename is optional.

$ nl -b p^A filename
       apple
    1  Apple
       BANANA
    2  Allspice
       strawberry

It can be useful as an alternative to grep -n:

$ cat somefile
aaaa
bbbb
cccc
dddc
$ nl -ba somefile | grep cccc
    3 cccc

== See also ==
- wc (Unix) – the word count command
- cat (Unix) – concatenate command (-n flag is equivalent to nl -a)
- List of Unix commands
