= Pr (Unix) =

pr
- Original authors: Ken Thompson, Dennis Ritchie (AT&T Bell Laboratories)
- Developers: Various open-source and commercial developers
- Initial release: November 3, 1971; 54 years ago
- Operating system: Unix, Unix-like, Plan 9, OS-9, IBM i
- Platform: Cross-platform
- Type: Command
- License: coreutils: GPLv3+

pr is a command on various operating systems that is used to paginate or columnate computer files for printing. It can also be used to compare two files side by side, as an alternative to diff.

It is a required program in a POSIX-compliant environment and has been implemented by GNU as part of the GNU Core Utilities. The command is available as a separate package for Microsoft Windows as part of the UnxUtils collection of native Win32 ports of common GNU Unix-like utilities. It is also available in the OS-9 shell. The pr command has also been ported to the IBM i operating system.
