= WebAI =

American AI technology company

webAI
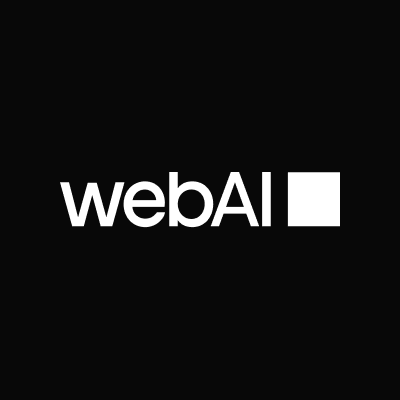
- Type: Private
- Industry: Artificial Intelligence
- Founded: 2019
- Founders: David Stout, Tyler Mauer, Ethan Baird
- Headquarters: Austin, Texas
- Products: Navigator, Companion
- Number of employees: 120+
- Website: webai.com

webAI is a technology company that specializes in privacy-focused artificial intelligence (AI) solutions. The company enables organizations to deploy AI models locally on devices, minimizing reliance on cloud infrastructures. webAI's technology emphasizes data privacy, reduced latency, and optimized performance.

== History ==
webAI was founded in 2019 by David Stout, Tyler Mauer, and Ethan Baird with the goal of creating AI systems that could run directly on devices, addressing privacy concerns associated with cloud computing. In 2024, the company announced it completed its Series A funding, bringing its total capital raised to $60 million at a $700 million valuation.

== Products ==
webAI offers a platform for deploying artificial intelligence models on Apple devices, including Mac, iPad, and iPhone. The platform enables businesses to use AI models locally on their devices without relying on cloud-based processing.

The webAI platform includes several key products:

- Navigator – A drag-and-drop interface that connects cameras and other data inputs, allowing users to train AI models using existing hardware for specific use cases.
- webAI Assistant – A device-native AI assistant that operates without connecting to external networks. It interacts with users' screens, folders, and apps directly on the device.
- webFrame – A tool that divides large language models into smaller components, which are then distributed across multiple Apple devices. This allows for the creation of local hardware clusters that perform tasks similar to traditional GPU clusters.

The platform emphasizes privacy and security by processing AI tasks on local devices, giving users control over their data. It also reduces costs by utilizing Apple silicon to run AI models on existing hardware, eliminating the need for cloud infrastructure. The system is designed to scale for enterprise use, allowing businesses to deploy AI models across their organization with reduced latency.
