= Uniq =

Unix text filtering utility

uniq
- Original authors: Ken Thompson (AT&T Bell Laboratories)
- Developers: Various open-source and commercial developers
- Initial release: February 1973; 53 years ago
- Written in: C
- Operating system: Unix, Unix-like, Plan 9, Inferno, MSX-DOS, IBM i
- Platform: Cross-platform
- Type: Command
- License: coreutils: GPLv3+ Plan 9: MIT License
- Website: man7.org/linux/man-pages/man1/uniq.1.html

uniq is a utility command on Unix, Plan 9, Inferno, and Unix-like operating systems which, when fed a text file or standard input, outputs the text with adjacent identical lines collapsed to one, unique line of text.

== Overview ==
The command is a kind of filter program. Typically it is used after sort. It can also output only the duplicate lines (with the -d option), or add the number of occurrences of each line (with the -c option). For example, the following command lists the unique lines in a file, sorted by the number of times each occurs:

$ sort file | uniq -c | sort -n

Using uniq like this is common when building pipelines in shell scripts.

== History ==
First appearing in Version 3 Unix, uniq is now available for a number of different Unix and Unix-like operating systems. It is part of the X/Open Portability Guide since issue 2 of 1987. It was inherited into the first version of POSIX and the Single Unix Specification.

The version bundled in GNU coreutils was written by Richard Stallman and David MacKenzie.

A uniq command is also part of ASCII's MSX-DOS2 Tools for MSX-DOS version 2.

The command is available as a separate package for Microsoft Windows as part of the GnuWin32 project and the UnxUtils collection of native Win32 ports of common GNU Unix-like utilities.

The uniq command has also been ported to the IBM i operating system.

== See also ==
- List of Unix commands
