= Paste (Unix) =

Shell command for joining files horizontally

paste
- Original authors: AT&T Bell Labs
- Developer: GNU Project
- Initial release: 1973 (as part of Version 4 Unix)
- Written in: C
- Operating system: Unix, Unix-like (Linux, macOS)
- Platform: POSIX-compliant systems, Cross-platform
- Type: Command-line utility
- License: coreutils: GPL v3+
- Website: GNU manual

paste is a shell command that joins files horizontally (parallel merging) by writing to standard output lines consisting of the sequentially corresponding lines of each input file, separated by tabs.

The command reads each specified input file line-by-line. For each set of input lines, the command outputs a line formatted as the concatenation of the input files' lines separated by a tab character. If the content of a file runs out, the command will use an empty string for the file. As such, the number of output lines will equal the number of lines of the file with the most lines. Some implementations support using a fixed string (such as "NA") when a files content is exhausted before the others.

A sequence of empty records at the bottom of a column of the output stream may or may not have been present in the input file corresponding to that column as explicit empty records, unless you know the input file supplied all rows explicitly (e.g. in the canonical case where all input files all do indeed have the same number of lines).

The command accepts the following options:

-d|--delimiters delimiters, specifies a list of delimiters to use instead of tabs for separating consecutive values on a single line. Each delimiter is used in turn, and when the list has been exhausted, paste begins again at the first delimiter.

-s|--serial, select to append in serial rather than in parallel; that is, horizontal rather than vertical.

The command was developed for Unix at Bell Labs by Gottfried W. R. Luderer. The implementation bundled in GNU coreutils was written by David M. Ihnat and David MacKenzie. The command is available for Windows via UnxUtils.

== Examples ==
For the following examples, names.txt is a plain-text file that contains:

Mark Smith
Bobby Brown
Sue Miller
Jenny Igotit

numbers.txt is another plain-text file that contains:

555-1234
555-9876
555-6743
867-5309

The following command joins the two files.

$ paste names.txt numbers.txt
Mark Smith	555-1234
Bobby Brown	555-9876
Sue Miller	555-6743
Jenny Igotit	867-5309

When invoked with the --serial option (-s on BSD or older systems), the files are joined horizontally:

$ paste --serial names.txt numbers.txt
Mark Smith	Bobby Brown	Sue Miller	Jenny Igotit
555-1234	555-9876	555-6734	867-5309

The use of the --delimiters option (-d on BSD or older systems) is illustrated in the following example:

$ paste --delimiters . names.txt numbers.txt
Mark Smith.555-1234
Bobby Brown.555-9876
Sue Miller.555-6743
Jenny Igotit.867-5309

Sum the numbers from 1 to 100:

$ seq 1 100 | paste -d + -s | bc
5050

== See also ==
- cut – Shell command for extracting sections of text files
- join – Command in Unix-like operating systems
- List of POSIX commands
