= Logname =

Standard UNIX utility

logname
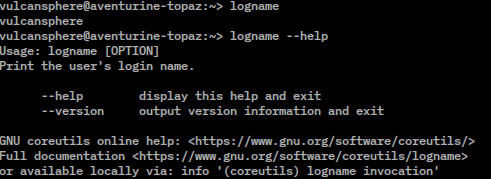
- example of logname command
- Initial release: 1982; 44 years ago
- Operating system: Unix and Unix-like
- Platform: Cross-platform
- Type: Command
- License: GNU GPL v3

In computer software, logname (stands for Login Name) is a program in Unix and Unix-like operating systems that prints the name of the user who is currently logged in on the terminal. It usually corresponds to the LOGNAME variable in the system-state environment (but this variable could have been modified).

== History ==
The logname system call and command appeared for the first time in UNIX System III. The author of the version of logname bundled in GNU coreutils is unknown. The command is available as a separate package for Microsoft Windows as part of the UnxUtils collection of native Win32 ports of common GNU Unix-like utilities.

== Usage ==
$ logname --help
Usage: logname [OPTION]
Print the name of the current user.

      --help     display this help and exit
      --version  output version information and exit

== See also ==
- whoami
