= Test (Unix) =

Command-line utility

test
- Other names: [
- Developers: Various open-source and commercial developers
- Written in: C
- Operating system: Unix, Unix-like, Plan 9, IBM i
- Platform: Cross-platform
- Type: Command
- License: coreutils: GPLv3+ Plan 9: MIT License

test is a command-line utility found in Unix, Plan 9, and Unix-like operating systems that evaluates conditional expressions. test was turned into a shell builtin command in 1981 with UNIX System III and at the same time made available under the alternate name [.

== Overview ==
The test command in Unix evaluates the expression parameter. In most recent shell implementations, it is a shell builtin, even though the external version still exists. In the second form of the command, the [ ] (brackets) must be surrounded by blank spaces (this is because [ is a program and POSIX compatible shells require a space between the program name and its arguments). One must test explicitly for file names in the C shell. File-name substitution (globbing) causes the shell script to exit.

The test command is not to be confused with the [[ reserved word that was introduced with ksh88. The latter is not a command but part of the ksh88 syntax and does not apply file-name substitution to glob expressions.

The version of test bundled in GNU coreutils was written by Kevin Braunsdorf and Matthew Bradburn. The command is available as a separate package for Microsoft Windows as part of the UnxUtils collection of native Win32 ports of common GNU Unix-like utilities. The test command has also been ported to the IBM i operating system.

== Syntax ==
test expression or [ expression ]

=== Arguments ===
The following arguments are used to construct this parameter. All arguments return True if the object (file or string) exists, and the condition specified is true.

Argument	Returns True if the file
-b	is a block special file
-c	is a character special file
-d	is a directory
-e	exists
-f	is a regular file
-g	has the Set Group ID bit set
-h	is a symbolic link
-k	has the sticky bit set
-L	is a symbolic link
-p	is a named pipe (FIFO)
-r	is readable by the current process
-s	has a size greater than 0
-t	FileDescriptor is open and associated with a terminal
-u	has the Set User ID bit set
-w	has the write flag is on
-x	has execute flag on
-z	check if the string length is zero or not

For the -x argument, if the specified file exists and is a directory, the True exit value indicates that the current process has permission to change cd into the directory.

==== Non standard Korn Shell extensions ====
file1 -nt file2 - file1 is newer than file2
file1 -ot file2 - file1 is older than file2
file1 -ef file2 - file1 is another name for file2 - (symbolic link or hard link)

==== String arguments ====
In Perl, these sections are reversed: eq is a string operator and == is a numerical operator, and so on for the others.

-n String1 - the length of the String1 variable is nonzero
-z String1 - the length of the String1 variable is 0 (zero)
String1 = String2 - String1 and String2 variables are identical
String1 != String2 - String1 and String2 variables are not identical
String1 - true if String1 variable is not a null string

==== Number arguments ====
Integer1 -eq Integer2 - Integer1 and Integer2 variables are algebraically equal
-ne - not equal
-gt - greater than
-ge - greater or equal 
-lt - less than
-le - less or equal

==== Operators ====
test arguments can be combined with the following operators:

! - Unary negation operator
-a - Binary AND operator
-o - Binary OR operator (the -a operator has higher precedence than the -o operator)
\(Expression\) - Parentheses for grouping must be escaped with a backslash \

The -a and -o operators, along with parentheses for grouping, are XSI extensions and are therefore not portable. In portable shell scripts, the same effect may be achieved by connecting multiple invocations of test together with the && and || operators and parentheses.

=== Exit status ===
This command returns the following exit values:

0 - The Expression parameter is true
1 - The Expression parameter is false or missing
>1 - An error occurred

== Examples ==
1. To test whether a file is nonexistent or empty, type:

 if test ! -s "$1"
 then
   echo $1 does not exist or is empty.
 fi

If the file specified by the first positional parameter to the shell procedure, $1, does not exist or is of size 0, the test command displays the message. If $1 exists and has a size greater than 0, the test command displays nothing.

Note: There must be a space between the -s function and the file name.

The quotation marks around $1 ensure that the test works properly even if the value of $1 is a null string. If the quotation marks are omitted and $1 is the empty string, the test command displays the error message:

test: argument expected.

2. To do a complex comparison, type:

 if [ "$#" -lt 2 ] || ! [ -e "$1" ]
 then
   exit
 fi

If the shell procedure is given fewer than two positional parameters or the file specified by $1 does not exist, then the shell procedure exits. The special shell variable $# represents the number of positional parameters entered on the command line that starts this shell procedure.

== See also ==
- List of POSIX commands
- Unix shell
- find (Unix)
