= Basename =

Shell command for extracting the last name from a path

basename
- Initial release: January 1979; 47 years ago
- Written in: C
- Operating system: Unix, Unix-like, IBM i, Plan 9, Inferno
- Platform: Cross-platform
- Type: Command
- License: coreutils: GPLv3+ Plan 9: MIT License

basename is a shell command for extracting the last name of a file path.

The command was introduced in X/Open Portability Guidelines issue 2 of 1987. It was inherited into the first version of POSIX and the Single Unix Specification. It first appeared in 4.4BSD. The version in GNU Core Utilities was written by David MacKenzie. The command is available for Windows as part of the GnuWin32 project and UnxUtils and is in IBM i.

== Use ==
The Single UNIX Specification is: basename path [suffix]. The required argument, path, is a file path string. The second argument, which is optional, is text to remove from the end of the last name if it ends with the text.

== Examples ==
The command reports the last part of a path ignoring any trailing slashes.

$ basename /path/to/filename.ext 
filename.ext

$ basename /path/to/
to

If the suffix argument is included and matches the end of the last name, then that text is removed from the result.

$ basename /path/to/filename.ext .ext
filename

$ basename /path/to/filename.ext xx
filename.ext

== See also ==
- dirname – Shell command for extracting the directory path portion from a path
- List of POSIX commands
