= Ptx (Unix) =

Computer program that produces concordances

ptx
- Operating system: Unix and Unix-like
- Platform: Cross-platform
- Type: Command

ptx is a Unix utility, named after the permuted index algorithm which it uses to produce a search or concordance report in the Keyword in Context (KWIC) format. It is available on most Unix and Unix-like operating systems (e.g. Linux, FreeBSD). The GNU implementation uses extensions that are more powerful than the older SysV implementation. The command is available as a separate package for Microsoft Windows as part of the UnxUtils collection of native Win32 ports of common GNU Unix-like utilities.

There is also a corresponding IBM mainframe utility which performs the same function. Permuted indexes are often used in such places as bibliographic or medical databases, documentation, thesauri, or web sites to aid in locating entries of interest.

== See also ==
- Concordancer
