= Seq (Unix) =

Unix utility to output a number sequence

seq
- Developer(s): AT&T Bell Laboratories
- Initial release: February 1985; 40 years ago
- Operating system: Unix, Unix-like, Plan 9
- Platform: Cross-platform
- Type: Command
- License: coreutils: GPLv3+

On Unix-like computer systems, seq is a utility for generating a sequence of numbers.

== History ==
seq first appeared on 8th edition Research Unix in 1985, and was not adopted by other variants of Unix (such as commercial Unixes or BSD). Nevertheless, it was later adopted in Plan 9 from Bell Labs, and from there was copied into some modern BSD descendants like FreeBSD. Another version of seq was written in 1994 by Ulrich Drepper, for GNU, and is now available on all Linux distributions as part of the GNU Core Utilities. The command is available as a separate package for Microsoft Windows as part of the UnxUtils collection of native Win32 ports of common GNU Unix-like utilities.

== Functionality ==
In its most basic use case, seq N prints out all the integers from 1 to N in sequence. This was convenient as the Unix shell at the time, the Bourne shell had no primitives for iterating over numbers, and its "for" command could only iterate over a list of words. seq was therefore used to generate such a list, as in this example:

# Remove file1 through file17:
for n in `seq 17`
do
    rm "file$n"
done

seq had additional options for controlling the start (not just end) of the numeric sequence, its increment (a floating point number), and the formatting of the number. GNU seq changed the name and meaning of the format option (from -p to -f) and added an option to control the separator between the numbers (-s, defaults to a newline).

With other alternatives available (e.g., expr), and with more recent shells adding builtin numeric iteration, seq is less commonly used today. In the modern Linux shell, bash, the above example can be alternatively written as:

for n in {1..17}
do
    rm "file$n"
done

and more efficiently, without actually generating the whole sequence in advance, as

for ((n=1; n<=17; n++))
do
    rm "file$n"
done
