= Dirname =

Shell command for extracting the directory path portion from a path

dirname
- Developers: Various open-source and commercial developers
- Written in: C
- Operating system: Unix, Unix-like, IBM i
- Platform: Cross-platform
- Type: Command
- License: coreutils: GPLv3+

dirname is a shell command for extracting the directory path portion of a path, without the last name. The command is specified in the Single UNIX Specification and is primarily used in shell scripts.

The version in GNU Core Utilities was written by David MacKenzie and Jim Meyering. The command is available for Windows as part of the GnuWin32 project and UnxUtils and is in IBM i.

== Usage ==
The Single UNIX Specification is: dirname path. The required argument, path, is a file path string.

== Examples ==
The command reports the directory path portion of a path ignoring any trailing slashes.

$ dirname /path/to/filename.ext
/path/to

$ dirname /path/to/
/path

$ dirname filename.ext
.

== Performance ==
Since the command accepts only one operand, its usage within the inner loop of a shell script can be detrimental to performance. Consider:

while read file; do
    dirname "$file"
done < some-input

The above causes a separate process invocation for each line of input. For this reason, shell substitution is typically used instead:

echo "${file%/*}";

Or, if relative pathnames need to be handled as well:

if [ -n "${file##*/*}" ]; then
    echo "."
else
    echo "${file%/*}";
fi

Note that these handle trailing slashes differently than dirname.

== See also ==
- basename – Shell command for extracting the last name from a path
- List of POSIX commands
