= Wc (Unix) =

Unix command utility

wc
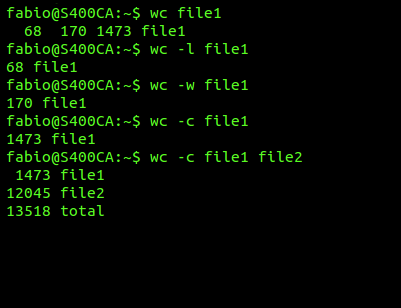
- The wc command
- Original authors: Joe Ossanna (AT&T Bell Laboratories)
- Developers: Various open-source and commercial developers
- Release: November 3, 1971; 54 years ago
- Written in: C
- Operating system: Unix, Unix-like, V, Plan 9, Inferno, MSX-DOS, IBM i
- Platform: Cross-platform
- Type: Command
- License: Plan 9, Inferno: MIT coreutils: GPL-3.0-or-later

wc (short for word count) is a command in Unix, Plan 9, Inferno, and operating systems that are Unix-like. The program reads either standard input or a list of computer files and generates one or more of the following statistics: newline count, word count, and byte count. If a list of files is provided, both individual file and total statistics follow.

== Example ==
Sample execution of wc:

$ wc foo bar
     40     149     947 foo
   2294   16638   97724 bar
   2334   16787   98671 total

The first column is the count of newlines, meaning that the text file foo has 40 newlines while bar has 2294 newlines- resulting in a total of 2334 newlines. The second column indicates the number of words in each text file showing that there are 149 words in foo and 16638 words in bar – giving a total of 16787 words. The last column indicates the number of characters in each text file, meaning that the file foo has 947 characters while bar has 97724 characters – 98671 characters all in all.

Newer versions of wc can differentiate between byte and character count. This difference arises with Unicode which includes multi-byte characters. The desired behaviour is selected with the -c or -m options.

Through a pipeline, it can also be used to preview the output size of a command with a potentially large output, without it printing the text into the console:

$ grep -r "example" | wc
    1071   23337  101349

== History ==
wc is part of the X/Open Portability Guide since issue 2 of 1987. It was inherited into the first version of POSIX.1 and the Single Unix Specification. It appeared in Version 1 Unix.

GNU wc used to be part of the GNU textutils package; it is now part of GNU coreutils. The version of wc bundled in GNU coreutils was written by Paul Rubin and David MacKenzie.

A wc command is also part of ASCII's MSX-DOS2 Tools for MSX-DOS version 2.

The command is available as a separate package for Microsoft Windows as part of the GnuWin32 project and the UnxUtils collection of native Win32 ports of common GNU Unix-like utilities.

The wc command has also been ported to the IBM i operating system.

== Usage ==
- wc -c <filename> prints the byte count
- wc -l <filename> prints the line count
- wc -m <filename> prints the character count
- wc -w <filename> prints the word count
- wc -L <filename> prints the length of the longest line (GNU extension)

== See also ==
- List of Unix commands
