= Unexpand =

unexpand
- Operating system: Unix and Unix-like
- Platform: Cross-platform
- Type: Command

unexpand is a shell command that converts space characters to tab characters. Originally, developed for Unix and standardized by POSIX, it is available on many operating systems today.

In the following commands, the echo command prints a string of text that includes multiple consecutive spaces. The output is directed into unexpand. The resulting output is displayed as octal via od. At the second prompt, the same echo output is sent directly to od. As shown, unexpand converts each sequence of eight spaces to a tab (printed as '\t').

$ echo "                 asdf sdf" | unexpand | od -c
0000000  \t  \t       a   s   d   f       s   d   f  \n
0000014
$ echo "                 asdf sdf" | od -c
0000000
0000020       a   s   d   f       s   d   f  \n
0000032

== See also ==
- List of POSIX commands
- Expand (Unix)
