= Comm =

Shell command for comparing files

comm
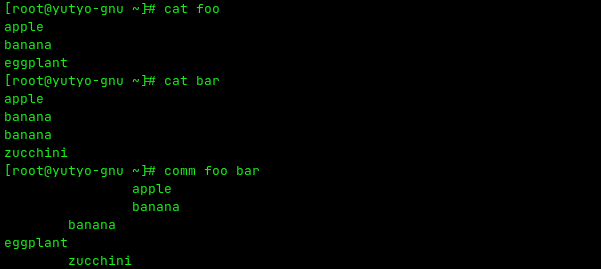
- Example usage of comm command
- Original author: Lee E. McMahon
- Developers: AT&T Bell Laboratories, Richard Stallman, David MacKenzie
- Initial release: November 1973; 52 years ago
- Written in: C
- Operating system: Unix, Unix-like, Plan 9, Inferno
- Platform: Cross-platform
- Type: Command
- License: coreutils: GPLv3+ Plan 9: MIT License

comm is a shell command for comparing two files for common and distinct lines. It reads the files as lines of text and outputs text as three columns. The first two columns contain lines unique to the first and second file, respectively. The last column contains lines common to both. Columns are typically separated with the tab character. If the input text contains lines beginning with the separator character, the output columns can become ambiguous.

For efficiency, standard implementations of comm expect both input files to be sequenced in the same line collation order, sorted lexically. The sort command can be used for this purpose. The comm algorithm makes use of the collating sequence of the current locale. If the lines in the files are not both collated in accordance with the current locale, the result is undefined.

The command is specified in the POSIX standard. It has been widely available on Unix-like operating systems since the mid to late 1980s. Originally implemented by Lee E. McMahon, the command first appeared in Version 4 Unix. The version in GNU coreutils was written by Richard Stallman and David MacKenzie.

== Example ==
$ cat foo
apple
banana
eggplant
$ cat bar
apple
banana
banana
zucchini
$ comm foo bar
                  apple
                  banana
          banana
eggplant
          zucchini

This shows that both files have one banana, but only bar has a second banana.

In more detail, the output file has the appearance that follows. Note that the column is interpreted by the number of leading tab characters. \t represents a tab character and \n represents a newline (Escape character#Programming and data formats).

	0	1	2	3	4	5	6	7	8	9
0	\t	\t	a	p	p	l	e	\n		
1	\t	\t	b	a	n	a	n	a	\n	
2	\t	b	a	n	a	n	a	\n		
3	e	g	g	p	l	a	n	t	\n	
4	\t	z	u	c	c	h	i	n	i	\n

== Limits ==
Up to a full line must be buffered from each input file during line comparison, before the next output line is written.

Some implementations read lines with the function readlinebuffer() which does not impose any line length limits if system memory suffices.

Other implementations read lines with the function fgets(). This function requires a fixed buffer. For these implementations, the buffer is often sized according to the POSIX macro LINE_MAX.

== Comparison to diff ==
Although also a file comparison command, diff reports significantly different information than comm. In general, diff is more powerful than comm. The simpler comm is best suited for use in scripts.

The primary distinction between comm and diff is that comm discards information about the order of the lines prior to sorting.

A minor difference between comm and diff is that comm will not try to indicate that a line has changed between the two files; lines are either shown in the "from file #1", "from file #2", or "in both" columns. This can be useful if one wishes two lines to be considered different even if they only have subtle differences.

Unlike for diff, the exit code of comm does not indicate whether the files match. As is typical, 0 indicates success, and other positive values indicate an error.

== See also ==
- Comparison of file comparison tools
- List of POSIX commands
- cmp (Unix) – File comparison command
- cut (Unix) – Shell command for extracting sections of text files
