= Chown =

Shell command for changing the owner of a file

chown
- Example usage of chown command
- Original authors: Ken Thompson, Dennis Ritchie
- Developer: AT&T Bell Laboratories
- Initial release: November 3, 1971; 54 years ago
- Operating system: Unix and Unix-like, IBM i
- Platform: Cross-platform
- Type: Command

chown /ˈtʃoʊn/, short for change owner, is a shell command for changing the owning user of Unix-based file system files – including special files such as directories.

The ownership of a file may only be altered by a super-user (such as via sudo). A regular user cannot give away their ownership of a file.

The version of chown bundled in GNU coreutils was written by David MacKenzie and Jim Meyering.

The command is available for Windows via UnxUtils. The command was ported to IBM i.

== See also ==
- chgrp – Shell command for changing the group of a file
- chmod – Shell command for changing access permissions of a file
- List of POSIX commands
- takeown
