= Install (Unix) =

Unix shell command

install is a shell command that copies files in ways that are particularly useful for implementing a software installation process. Features beyond copying include creating directories, setting file permission, changing file ownership and stripping executable files.

The command is available in many Unix systems and Linux distributions, but unlike many other long-standing and commonly-used Unix utilities, it is not defined by POSIX. The command is available for Windows via UnxUtils.

Two variants exists – one from GNU and one from BSD – with the major difference in how the options -D and -d work.
