= Split (Unix) =

UNIX text-processing utility program

split
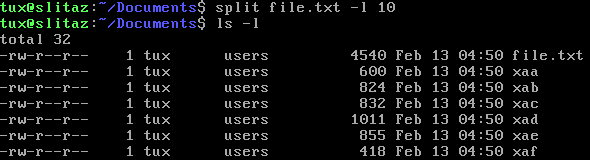
- Example of split usage
- Original author: AT&T Bell Laboratories
- Developers: Various open-source and commercial developers
- Initial release: February 1973; 53 years ago
- Written in: C
- Operating system: Unix, Unix-like, Plan 9, IBM i
- Platform: Cross-platform
- Type: Command
- License: coreutils: GPLv3+ Plan 9: MIT License

split is a utility on Unix, Plan 9, and Unix-like operating systems most commonly used to split a computer file into two or more smaller files.

== History ==
The split command first appeared in Version 3 Unix and is part of the X/Open Portability Guide since issue 2 of 1987. It was inherited into the first version of POSIX.1 and the Single Unix Specification. The version of split bundled in GNU coreutils was written by Torbjorn Granlund and Richard Stallman. The split command has also been ported to the IBM i operating system.

== Usage ==
The command-syntax is:

 split [OPTION] [INPUT [PREFIX]]

The default behavior of split is to generate output files of a fixed size, default 1000 lines. The files are named by appending aa, ab, ac, etc. to output filename. If output filename is not given, the default filename of x is used, for example, xaa, xab, etc. When a hyphen (-) is used instead of input filename, data is derived from standard input. The files are typically rejoined using a utility such as cat.

Additional program options permit a maximum character count (instead of a line count), a maximum line length, how many incrementing characters in generated filenames, and whether to use letters or digits.

=== Split file into pieces ===
Create a file named "myfile.txt" with exactly 3,000 lines of data:

$ head -3000 < /dev/urandom > myfile.txt

Now, use the split command to break this file into pieces (note: unless otherwise specified, split will break the file into 1,000-line files):

$ split myfile.txt
$ ls -l
-rw-r--r--  1 root root 761K Jun 16 18:17 myfile.txt
-rw-r--r--  1 root root 242K Jun 16 18:17 xaa
-rw-r--r--  1 root root 263K Jun 16 18:17 xab
-rw-r--r--  1 root root 256K Jun 16 18:17 xac
$ wc --lines xa*
  1000 xaa
  1000 xab
  1000 xac
  3000 total

As seen above, the split command has broken the original file (keeping the original intact) into three, equal in number of lines (i.e., 1,000), files: xaa, xab, and xac.

== See also ==
- csplit – splits by content rather than by size
- File spanning
- List of Unix commands
