= Chgrp =

Shell command for changing the group of a file

chgrp
- Example usage of chgrp command to change the files' groups
- Developer: AT&T Bell Laboratories
- Initial release: May 1975; 50 years ago
- Written in: Plan 9: C
- Operating system: Unix, Unix-like, Plan 9, Inferno, IBM i
- Platform: Cross-platform
- Type: Command
- License: Plan 9: MIT License

chgrp, short for change group, is a shell command for changing the group associated with a Unix-based file system file – including special files such as directories. Changing the group of a file is restricted to a super-user (such as via sudo) or to the file's owning user if the user is in the specified group.

A file has access permissions for the owning user, a group and for others. Changing the group for a file changes access to it based on users' group memberships.

== History ==
The chgrp command was originally developed as part of the Unix operating system by AT&T Bell Laboratories. It is available in most Unix-like systems, Plan 9, Inferno and IBM i.

The version of chgrp bundled in GNU coreutils was written by David MacKenzie.

== Use ==
Generally, the syntax can be described as:

chgrp [options] group files

- group specifies the group with which the files should be associated; may be either a symbolic name or an identifier
- files specifies one or more files, which may be the result of a glob expression like *.conf

Options:

- -R Recurse through directories
- -v Verbose output: log the name of each file changed
- -f Force or forge ahead even if an error occurs

== Examples ==
The following demonstrates changing the group of files matching *.conf to staff – provided the user owns the files (is gbeeker) and is a member of staff. The change will allow members of the group staff to modify the files since the group-class permissions (read/write) will apply, not the others-class permissions (read only).

$ ls -l *.conf
-rw-rw-r--   1 gbeeker  wheel          3545 Nov 04 2011  prog.conf
-rw-rw-r--   1 gbeeker  wheel          3545 Nov 04 2011  prox.conf
$ chgrp staff *.conf
$ ls -l *.conf
-rw-rw-r--   1 gbeeker  staff          3545 Nov 04 2011  prog.conf
-rw-rw-r--   1 gbeeker  staff          3545 Nov 04 2011  prox.conf

== See also ==
- chmod – Shell command for changing access permissions of a file
- chown – Shell command for changing the owner of a file
- Group identifier (Unix) – Unix/POSIX system account group number; numeric value used to represent a specific group
- List of POSIX commands
