= Pwd =

Shell command that reports the working directory

pwd
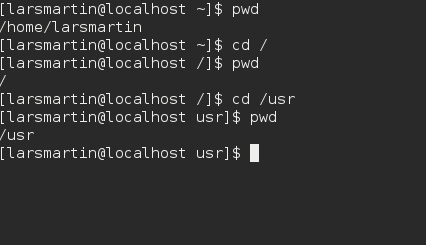
- The pwd command
- Original author: AT&T Bell Laboratories
- Developers: Various open-source and commercial developers
- Release: June 1974; 52 years ago
- Written in: C
- Operating system: Multics, Unix, Unix-like, V, Plan 9, Inferno, SpartaDOS X, PANOS, Windows CE, KolibriOS
- Platform: Cross-platform
- Type: Command
- License: coreutils: GPLv3+ Plan 9: MIT License

pwd (print working directory) is a shell command that reports the working directory path to standard output.

Although often associated with Unix, its predecessor Multics had a pwd command (which was a short name of the print_wdir command) from which the Unix command originated. The command is part of the X/Open Portability Guide since issue 2 of 1987. It was inherited into the first version of POSIX.1 and the Single Unix Specification. It appeared in Version 5 Unix. The version bundled in GNU Core Utilities was written by Jim Meyering.

The command is available in other shells and operating systems including SpartaDOS X, PANOS, and KolibriOS. PowerShell provides pwd as an alias for the cmdlet Get-Location. An equivalent command in COMMAND.COM and Command Prompt is the cd command with no arguments. On Windows CE 5.0, cmd.exe includes a pwd command. The OpenVMS equivalent is show default.

The numerical computing environments MATLAB and GNU Octave include a pwd function with similar functionality.

The command is implemented as a shell builtin in many Unix shells including sh, ash, bash, ksh, and zsh. It can be implemented with the POSIX getcwd() or getwd() functions.

== Examples ==
The following examples are based on a typical Unix-based implementation.

With no arguments, the command writes the working directory path to the terminal:

$ cd /home/example
$ pwd
/home/example

Display the working directory without any symbolic link info. If at a directory /home/symlinked that is a symlink to /home/realdir:

$ cd /home/symlinked
$ pwd -P
/home/realdir

Display the working directory with symbolic link info. Note: POSIX requires that the default behavior be as if the -L switch were provided.

$ pwd -L
/home/symlinked

== Shell variables ==
POSIX shells set the following environment variables while using the cd command:

OLDPWD
The previous working directory
PWD
The current working directory

== See also ==
- Breadcrumb (navigation), an alternative way of displaying the work directory
- List of POSIX commands
- pushd and popd
