= Head (Unix) =

Program on Unix and Unix-like systems

head
- Example usage of head command to display first 5 lines of Lorem ipsum in the specified file
- Developers: Various open-source and commercial developers
- Operating system: Unix, Unix-like, MSX-DOS, IBM i
- Platform: Cross-platform
- Type: Command
- License: coreutils: GPLv3

head is a program on Unix and Unix-like operating systems used to display the beginning of a text file or piped data.

== Syntax ==
The command syntax is:

head [options] ⟨file_name⟩

By default, head will print the first 10 lines of its input to the standard output.

=== Option flags ===
-n ⟨count⟩
--lines=⟨count⟩
The number of lines printed may be changed with a command line option. The following example shows the first 20 lines of filename:

head -n 20 filename

This displays the first 5 lines of all files starting with foo:

head -n 5 foo*

Most versions allow omitting n and instead directly specifying the number: -5. GNU head allows negative arguments for the -n option, meaning to print all but the last - argument value counted - lines of each input file.
-c ⟨bytes⟩
--bytes=⟨bytes⟩
Print first x number of bytes.

== Other commands ==
Many early versions of Unix and Plan 9 did not have this command, and documentation and books used sed instead:

sed 5q filename

The example prints every line (implicit) and quit after the fifth.

Equivalently, awk may be used to print the first five lines in a file:

awk 'NR < 6' filename

However, neither sed nor awk were available in early versions of BSD, which were based on Version 6 Unix, and included head.

== Implementations ==
A head command is also part of ASCII's MSX-DOS2 Tools for MSX-DOS version 2. The head command has also been ported to the IBM i operating system.

== See also ==
- tail (Unix)
- dd (Unix)
- List of Unix commands
