= GnuWin32 =

Discontinued implementation of the GNU toolchain for Windows

- Last updated: 26 December 2017; 7 years ago
- Operating system: Microsoft Windows
- Licence: Free software
- Website: gnuwin32.sourceforge.net
- Development status: Unmaintained
- As of: December 2019

The GnuWin32 project provides native ports in the form of executable computer programs, patches, and source code for various GNU and open source tools and software, much of it modified to run on the 32-bit Windows platform. The ports included in the GnuWin32 packages are:

- GNU utilities such as bc, bison, chess, Coreutils, diffutils, ed, Flex, gawk, gettext, grep, Groff, gzip, iconv, less, m4, patch, readline, rx, sharutils, sed, tar, texinfo, units, Wget, which.
- Archive management and compression tools, such as: arc, arj, bzip2, gzip, lha, zip, zlib.
- Non-GNU utilities such as: cygutils, file, ntfsprogs, OpenSSL, PCRE.
- Graphics tools.
- PDCurses.
- Tools for processing text.
- Mathematical software and statistics software.

Most programs have dependencies (typically DLLs), so that the executable files cannot simply be run in Windows unless files they depend upon are available. An alternative set of ported programs is UnxUtils; these are usually older versions, but depend only on the Microsoft C-runtime msvcrt.dll.

There is a package maintenance utility, GetGnuWin32, to download and install or update current versions of all GnuWin32 packages.

== See also ==
- Cygwin
- DJGPP
- Windows Subsystem for Linux
- MinGW, MSYS
- UnxUtils
- UWIN
