= Native (computing) =

Software that operates directly in a given context

Native describes a computing system as operating directly with an underlying technology, with no intervening communication or translation layers.

== Native software ==
Native software is built to be executed directly by processors that implement a compatible instruction set. A program that runs natively on one platform is runnable on another platform via an emulator if an emulator is available and, generally, with significant runtime speed degradation. For example, games for a Game Boy (typically distributed as a cartridge), generally run natively on a Game Boy which is relatively incompatible with other computer platforms. To run such a game on another processor, software that emulates the Game Boy hardware is required.

Cross-platform software can run on multiple processors although possibly requiring it to be re-built for different target systems.

== Native API ==
A native application programming interface (API) provides direct access to an underlying technology. For example, the Windows Native API is an application programming interface specific for the Windows NT kernel, which provides access to some kernel functions which cannot be directly accessed through the more universal Windows API.

== Native VM ==
A native virtual machine (VM) runs directly on hardware, without virtualization or virtualization at its lowest level. For example, with multiple levels of virtualization, the lowest level operating system – the one that actually maintains direct control of the hardware – is referred to as a "Native VM".

== Native data ==
Applied to data, native data formats or communication protocols are those supported by a certain computer hardware or software, with maximal consistency and minimal amount of additional components.

For example, EGA and VGA video adapters natively support code page 437. This does not preclude supporting other code pages, but it requires either a font uploading or using graphic modes.

== Cloud Native ==
Cloud native refers to the approach of building, deploying, and managing applications in cloud computing environments – for software optimized for running on a cloud-based platform.
