= Outline of Ubuntu =

Linux distribution

Ubuntu is a Debian-based Linux distribution for personal computers, tablets and smartphones, where the Ubuntu Touch edition is used; and also runs network servers, usually with the Ubuntu Server edition, either on physical or virtual servers (such as on mainframes) or with containers, that is with enterprise-class features.

Ubuntu runs on the most popular architectures, including server-class ARM-based. Ubuntu is developed by Canonical Ltd., who offer commercial support.

== Overview ==
Ubuntu can be described as all of the following:

- Operating system —system software that manages computer hardware and software resources and provides common services for computer programs. All computer programs, excluding firmware, require an operating system to function.
  - Unix-like operating system — operating system that behaves in a manner similar to a Unix system, while not necessarily conforming to or being certified to any version of the Single UNIX Specification. There is no standard for defining the term, and some difference of opinion is possible as to the degree to which a given operating system is "Unix-like".
    - Debian-based operating system —Debian is a Unix-like computer operating system that is composed entirely of free software, most of which is under the GNU General Public License and packaged by a group of individuals participating in the Debian Project. Debian has many derivatives, among which Ubuntu is the most popular. Ubuntu, in turn, also has many derivatives...
- Free software
- Major proponent of the free-culture movement

== Ubuntu derivatives ==
Ubuntu family tree

=== Official editions ===
Official editions —official Ubuntu variants install a set of packages different from the original Ubuntu, but since they draw additional packages and updates from the same repositories as Ubuntu, all of the same software is available for each of them.

- Ubuntu Server —server edition that uses the same APT repositories as the Ubuntu Desktop Edition. The differences between them are the absence of an X Window environment in a default installation of the server edition (although one can easily be installed, including Unity, GNOME, KDE or Xfce), and some alterations to the installation process.
- Ubuntu Touch — mobile version of Ubuntu developed by Canonical Ltd. and the Ubuntu community. It is designed primarily for touchscreen mobile devices such as smartphones and tablet computers.
- Ubuntu Kylin — official Chinese version of Ubuntu.

==== Community supported ====
- Ubuntu Budgie —uses the Budgie desktop environment.
- Edubuntu —complete Linux based operating system targeted for primary and secondary education. It is freely available with community based support. The Edubuntu community is built on the ideas enshrined in the Edubuntu Manifesto: that software, especially for education, should be available free of charge and that software tools should be usable by people in their local language and despite any disabilities.
- Ubuntu GNOME — uses a pure GNOME desktop environment with GNOME Shell, rather than the Unity graphical shell, and uses GDM as its display manager.
- Kubuntu — uses the KDE Plasma Desktop instead of the Unity graphical environment.
- Lubuntu — "lightweight Ubuntu", which uses the LXDE desktop environment in place of Ubuntu's Unity shell and GNOME desktop. LXDE is touted as being "lighter, less resource hungry and more energy-efficient".
- Ubuntu MATE — uses the MATE desktop environment as its default user interface, forked from the now-defunct GNOME 2 code base, with an emphasis on the desktop metaphor.
- Ubuntu Server — An official derivative made for use in servers. Ubuntu Server handles mail, controls printers, acts as a fileserver, can host LAMP and more.
- Ubuntu Studio — provides open-source applications for multimedia creation by audio, video and graphic editors.
- Ubuntu Touch — Designed for use with touchscreen devices.
- Ubuntu TV — Designed for use with TVs.
- Xubuntu — intended for use on less-powerful computers or by those who seek a highly efficient desktop environment on faster systems, and it uses mostly GTK+ applications. For efficiency, it uses the Xfce desktop environment, instead of Ubuntu's Unity.

=== Third-party distributions ===
Unofficial variants and derivatives are not controlled or guided by Canonical Ltd. and generally have different goals in mind.

- Aurora — Specifically for the Eee PC range of netbooks, based on Debian. Previously named Eeebuntu and based on Ubuntu.
- Baltix — Ubuntu-based distribution for Lithuanian and Latvian people. Supported languages are Lithuanian, Latvian, Estonian, Russian, English, Norwegian and others in the Baltic region. The main language is Lithuanian.
- BackBox — BackBox is a Linux distribution based on Ubuntu. It has been developed to perform penetration tests and security assessments. Designed to be fast, easy to use and provide a minimal yet complete desktop environment, thanks to its own software repositories, always being updated to the latest stable version of the most used and best known ethical hacking tools.
- BackTrack — Developed by Offensive Security and designed for penetration testing; superseded by Kali Linux
- BlankOn — Ubuntu-based distribution for users in Indonesia
- Bodhi Linux — An Ubuntu-based Linux distribution featuring the Moksha Desktop environment and targeting users who want a minimum of preinstalled software or low system requirements.
- dyne:bolic — Live CD geared toward multimedia (audio and video) production, but comes with other non-media specific application (e.g. word processor, desktop publisher)
- EasyPeasy — customized for netbooks, low-powered computers, and access to web applications.
- Element OS — Based on Xubuntu, made for Home theater PCs
- elementary OS — A powerful, user-friendly distribution known for its well received user interface and devoted community of developers and artists. Flagship distribution to showcase the Pantheon desktop environment.
- Emmabuntüs — designed to facilitate the repacking of personal computers donated to humanitarian organizations like the Emmaüs Communities.
- Galsoft Linux — A Linux distribution derived from Lubuntu that is made to be installed from a DVD or a USB flash drive. The distribution is specially optimized to run efficiently with limited hardware resources.
- GendBuntu — A version adapted for use by France's National Gendarmerie.
- Goobuntu — An Ubuntu-based distribution used internally by Google; not available outside of Google
- gOS — Uses the GNOME desktop environment with user interface enhancements to make it work more like Mac OS X, it also features Google Apps, Picasa, Google Gadgets and other web-based applications, and comes with Wine 1.0 pre-installed.
- Guadalinex — Ubuntu-based distribution promoted by the local government of Andalucia, Spain, for home users and schools.
- Iskolinux — A Linux distribution packaged and maintained by UP Manila's (UPM) Information Management System as part of University of the Philippines' thrust to migrate to Linux.
- Joli OS — Joli OS (formerly named Jolicloud) is in development and Pre-beta testing. Joli OS is built upon Debian and Ubuntu 9.10, but is tweaked to be more suitable for computers that have weaker specifications in terms of disk storage, memory and screen size. It is designed to run on relatively low-powered netbook computers.
- Impi Linux — South African and focuses on the enterprise and government sector.
- Karoshi — A formerly PCLinuxOS-based distribution designed for use in schools.
- Kuki Linux — Lightweight Ubuntu-based Linux distribution founded by João Ferro, built to be a replacement for the Linpus Linux Lite distribution on the Acer Aspire One.
- LiMux — A project by the city council of Munich, Germany
- Linux Lite — The purpose of Linux Lite is to introduce Windows users to Linux, and provide them with a comfortable and useful user experience. It is designed to be simple and suitable for new Linux users who want a lightweight, highly responsive, and fully functional environment.
- Linux Mint — Linux Mint synchronizes its release-cycle with Ubuntu's long-term support, and is tailored to user-friendliness for desktop users. Also features a Debian-based edition. It uses the Cinnamon desktop environment, and provides full out-of-the-box multimedia support by including some proprietary software along with a variety of free and open-source applications.
- LinuxMCE — Linux Media Center Edition, a Kubuntu-based distribution that provides in-depth HTPC functionality as well as home automation.
- LinuxTLE — A Thai Linux distribution
- LliureX — A distribution by the Generalitat Valenciana
- LOUD — LCSEE Optimized Ubuntu Distribution, an Ubuntu distribution used at West Virginia University. It contains several specialized educational packages as well as its own themes and login manager.
- MAX — Stands for Madrid LinuX
- Molinux — Ubuntu based initiative to introduce the Castile-La Mancha community in Spain to the information society.
- Nova — Cuban state-sponsored distribution developed at the University of Information Science, Havana. Formerly based on Gentoo.
- Netrunner — Kubuntu based distribution with complete software and codecs installed, developed by Blue Systems (also sponsoring Kubuntu and LinuxMintKDE).
- OpenGEU — Ubuntu based distribution with Enlightenment window manager, previously known as Geubuntu.
- Peppermint OS — A light-weight LXDE distribution for cloud applications through its own Ice Framework using Chromium Web Browser. Based on Lubuntu
- Pinguy OS — An Ubuntu-based distro for people that have never used Linux before or for people that want an out-of-the-box working OS without having to tweak a fresh installation of Ubuntu or other Ubuntu-based distro.
- Pop!_OS, a distribution developed by System76, primarily for the hardware that they manufacture
- Poseidon Linux — For academic and scientific use. Based on Ubuntu, but enhanced by GIS/maps, numerical modelling, 2D/3D/4D visualization, statistics, tools for creating simple and complex graphics, programming languages.
- PUD — A small distribution, aimed at being simple and usable
- Qimo 4 Kids — Educational games for children aged three and up. Ubuntu-based with easy-to-use interface.
- Sabily — Ubuntu based distribution for Muslims (formerly Ubuntu Muslim Edition)
- Trisquel GNU/Linux — fully free-software system without proprietary software or firmware and uses the Linux-libre kernel, based on Ubuntu LTS Releases
- UberStudent — For higher education and advanced secondary students, those who teach them, and lifelong learners
- Ututo — Ututo UL ("Ubuntu-Libre") Distributes Simusol, a system to simulate Solar Energy projects, returned to the heart of the project.
- Vinux — A Linux distribution designed for visually impaired users

== Features and components ==
- Linux kernel — monolithic Unix-like computer operating system kernel. The Linux operating system is based on this kernel and deployed on both traditional computer systems such as personal computers and servers, usually in the form of Linux distributions (including Ubuntu and its derivatives), and on various embedded devices such as routers, wireless access points, PBXes, set-top boxes, FTA receivers, smart TVs, PVRs and NAS appliances.
- LightDM — X display manager that aims to be lightweight, fast, extensible and multi-desktop. It uses various front-ends to draw login interfaces, also called Greeters.
- man pages
- Mir display server
- Side Stage
- Snappy — software deployment and package management system originally designed and built by Canonical for the Ubuntu phone operating system. The packages, called 'snaps' and the tool for using them 'snapd', work across a range of Linux distributions and allow therefore distro-agnostic upstream software deployment. The system is designed to work for phone, cloud, internet of things and desktop computing. Snappy is included by default in Ubuntu 16.04 desktop images.
- Uncomplicated Firewall — program for managing a netfilter firewall designed to be easy to use. It uses a command-line interface consisting of a small number of simple commands, and uses iptables for configuration. UFW is available by default in all Ubuntu installations after 8.04 LTS.
- Upstart
- Usplash
- User interfaces
  - Unity
  - Desktop environments used in Ubuntu variations
    - Budgie
    - KDE Plasma 5
- Wubi
- XSplash — software project in the Ubuntu community that uses the X Window System to replace the scrolling-text screens that appear while booting a Linux-based computer with a graphical splash screen. It replaced usplash (which uses the Linux framebuffer) to bring Ubuntu closer to the goal of a 10-second boot time by version 10.04.
- X Window System

=== Command-line utilities and shell builtins included in Ubuntu ===
==== Diagnostics and repair ====
- fsck (file system consistency check) — check and repair a Linux file system.

==== Documentation ====
- man — retrieve a man page, a software documentation page that explains a command or command-line utility program.

==== File system ====
- cat — concatenate (join) files
- chmod — command and system call that may change the access permissions to file system objects (files and directories). It may also alter special mode flags.
- chown — change the owner of file system files, directories. Abbreviation of "change owner".
- chgrp — used by unprivileged users on Unix-like systems to change the group associated with a file system object (such as a file, directory, or link) to one of which they are a member. A file system object has 3 sets of access permissions, one set for the owner, one set for the group and one set for others. Changing the group of an object could be used to change which users can write to a file.
- cksum — generates a checksum value for a file or stream of data. The cksum command reads each file given in its arguments, or standard input if no arguments are provided, and outputs the file's CRC checksum and byte count. It is used to verify that files transferred by unreliable means arrived intact.
- cmp — compares two files of any type and writes the results to the standard output. By default, cmp is silent if the files are the same; if they differ, the byte and line number at which the first difference occurred is reported.
- cp — copy files.
- dd — convert and copy a file.
- du — estimate file system usage (space used under a particular directory or files on a file system).
- df — report free disk space.
- file — determine file type.
- fuser — list process IDs of all processes that have one or more files open.
- ln — link files.
- ls — list directory contents.
- mkdir — make directory.
- mv — move or rename files.
- pax — portable archive interchange.
- pwd — print working directory; return working directory name.
- rm — remove objects such as files, directories, device nodes, symbolic links, and so on from the filesystem.
- rmdir — Remove directories, if they are empty.
- split — Split files into pieces.
- tee — reads standard input and writes it to both standard output and one or more files, effectively duplicating its input. The command is named after the T-splitter used in plumbing.
- touch — change file access and modification times.
- type — display a command name's path.
- umask — determines the settings of a mask that controls how file permissions are set for newly created files.

==== Processes ====
- at — execute commands at a later time.
- bg — run jobs in the background.
- cron — schedule periodic background work.
- fg — run jobs in the foreground.
- kill — send a signal to a process. By default, the message sent is the termination signal, which requests that the process exit.
- nice — invoke a utility or shell script with a particular priority, thus giving the process more or less CPU time than other processes. A niceness of −20 is the highest priority and 19 is the lowest priority. The default niceness for processes is inherited from its parent process and is usually 0.
- ps — report process status.
- sudo — allows users to run programs with the security privileges of another user, by default the superuser.
- time — used to determine the duration of execution of a particular command.

==== Searching ====
- apropos — search the man page files (command names and their descriptions).
- find — find files; searches one or more directory trees of a file system, locates files based on some user-specified criteria and applies a user-specified action on each matched file.
- grep — search plain-text files for lines that match a regular expression.

==== Shell builtins ====
Shell builtins

- alias — enables a replacement of a word by another string. It is mainly used for abbreviating a system command, or for adding default arguments to a regularly used command.
- cd — change the working directory.
- echo — outputs a specified string to the screen.
- test — evaluate an expression.
- unset — unsets a shell variable, removing it from memory and the shell's exported environment.
- wait — pauses until execution of a background process has ended.

==== Software development ====
- ar
- ctags
- lex
- make
- nm
- strip
- yacc

==== Text processing ====
- awk
- basename
- comm
- csplit
- cut
- diff
- dirname
- ed
- ex
- fold
- head
- iconv
- join
- less — terminal pager program used to view (but not change) the contents of a text file one screen at a time. It is similar to more, but has the extended capability of allowing both forward and backward navigation through the file.
- m4
- more — display files one screen-at-a-time
- nl
- paste
- printf
- sed
- sort
- strings
- tail
- tr
- uniq
- vi
- wc
- xargs

==== User environment ====
- env
- exit
- logname
- mesg
- talk
- tput
- uname
- who
- write

==== Miscellaneous ====
- bc
- cal
- expr
- lp
- od
- sleep
- true and false

=== Fonts ===
- Ubuntu (typeface)
- Ubuntu-Title

=== Related technology ===
- AppArmor
- APT
- deb format
- dpkg

== Applications ==
- Bazaar
- Juju
- Live USB creator
- Software Updater
- Ubiquity

=== Related applications ===
- Brasero
- GNOME Files

== History of Ubuntu ==
- Medibuntu — was a community-maintained repository of Debian packages that could not be included in the Ubuntu distribution for legal reasons. It ceased operations in 2013.

=== Terminated or discontinued official distributions ===
- Gobuntu — aimed to provide a distribution consisting entirely of free software. It was officially announced by Mark Shuttleworth on July 10, 2007, and daily builds of Gobuntu 7.10 began to be publicly released. The project ended around the release of 8.04 and has since merged into mainline Ubuntu as a 'free software' option.
- Mythbuntu — based on Ubuntu and MythTV, providing applications for recording TV and acting as a media center. On 4 November 2016 the development team announced the end of Mythbuntu as a separate distribution, citing insufficient developers.
- Ubuntu for Android — designed for use with Android phones. No longer under active development.
- Ubuntu JeOS — "Just Enough OS", was described as "an efficient variant [...] configured specifically for virtual appliances". Since the release of Ubuntu 8.10 it has been included as an option as part of the standard Ubuntu Server Edition.
- Ubuntu Mobile — embedded operating system designed for use on mobile devices. The operating system will use Hildon from maemo as its graphical frontend. Ubuntu Touch is a successor to Ubuntu Mobile.
- Ubuntu Netbook Edition — designed for netbooks using the Intel Atom processor. Starting from Ubuntu 11.04, Ubuntu Netbook Edition has been merged into the desktop edition.
- Ubuntu TV

=== Discontinued applications ===
- StartUp-Manager
- Ubuntu One
- Ubuntu Software Center
- Wubi

== Hardware ==
- System76
- Ubuntu Edge

== Ubuntu community ==
=== Organizations ===
- Canonical Ltd. — UK-based privately held computer software company founded and funded by South African entrepreneur Mark Shuttleworth to market commercial support and related services for Ubuntu and related projects. Canonical employs staff in more than 30 countries and maintains offices in London, Austin, Boston, Shanghai, Beijing, Taipei, and the Isle of Man.

=== Support ===
- Ask Ubuntu — community-driven question-and-answer Web site for Ubuntu. It is part of the Stack Exchange Network, running the same software as Stack Overflow. As of August 2016, Ask Ubuntu reached 373,000 registered users and more than 239,000 questions.
- Launchpad
- Paper cut bug
- Personal Package Archive
- Restricted extras
- Ubuntu Forums
- Ubuntu One
  - Ubuntu Single Sign On

==== By third party ====
- GetDeb

=== Media ===
==== Periodicals ====
- Full Circle — free distribution monthly Portable Document Format magazine aimed at users of the Ubuntu operating system and all its derivatives, including Kubuntu, Lubuntu, Xubuntu, Edubuntu, as well as others like Linux Mint and its derivatives. It focuses on product reviews, community news, how-to articles, programming and troubleshooting tips. The first issue of Full Circle was published in April 2007.
  - 2017: May April March February January
  - 2016: December November October September August July June May April March February January
- Ubuntu User — commercial paper magazine focusing on reviews, community news, how to articles, and troubleshooting tips pertaining to Ubuntu.

=== Books about Ubuntu ===
==== Free books ====
- Getting Started with Ubuntu 16.04 — The Ubuntu Manual Team, 2016

==== Commercial books ====
- Beginning Ubuntu Linux: From Novice to Professional — Thomas Keir, Apress, 2006, ISBN 978-1-59059-627-2
- Moving to Ubuntu Linux — 1st edition, Marcel Gagne, Addison-Wesley Professional, 2006, ISBN 978-0-321-42722-9.
- The Official Ubuntu Book — 9th edition, Matthew Helmke, Elizabeth K. Joseph, Jonathan Jesse, and José Antonio Rey, Pearson Education, 2016, ISBN 9780134513423
- Ubuntu 14.04 – Everyday usage — Sasa Paporovic, CreateSpace, 2014, Video-Tutorial
- Ubuntu for Non-Geeks: A Pain-Free, Get-Things-Done Guide — 4th edition, Rick Grant and Phil Bull, No Starch Press, 2010, ISBN 978-1-59327-257-9.
- Ubuntu Hacks: Tips & Tools for Exploring, Using, and Tuning Linux — 1st edition, Jonathan Oxer, Kyle Rankin, and Bill Childers, O'Reilly Media, 2006, ISBN 978-0-596-52720-4
- Ubuntu Linux Bible — 1st edition, William von Hagen, John Wiley & Sons, 2007, ISBN 978-0-470-03899-4
- Ubuntu Unleashed: Covering 9.10 and 10.4 — 5th edition, Andrew Hudson, Paul Hudson, Matthew Helmke, and Ryan Troy, SAMS Publishing, 2010, ISBN 978-0-672-33109-1

=== Persons influential in Ubuntu ===
- Jono Bacon — Ubuntu Community Manager from 4 September 2006 until 28 May 2014, for Canonical Ltd.
- Benjamin Mako Hill — co-author of The Official Ubuntu Server Book, and The Official Ubuntu Book.
- Mark Shuttleworth — funded and founded Canonical Ltd. Was CEO until March 2010.
- Jane Silber — Chief Executive Officer at Canonical Ltd. since March 2010.

== See also ==
- Ubuntu (philosophy)
- aptitude
- dash
- debconf package
