= Research Unix =

Original Unix operating system from Bell Labs

Research Unix refers to the early versions of the Unix operating system for DEC PDP-7, PDP-11, VAX, and Interdata 7/32 and 8/32 computers, developed in the Bell Labs Computing Sciences Research Center (CSRC). The term Research Unix first appeared in the Bell System Technical Journal (Vol. 57, No. 6, Part 2 July/August 1978) to distinguish it from other versions internal to Bell Labs (such as PWB/UNIX and MERT) whose code-base had diverged from the primary CSRC version. However, that term was little-used until Version 8 Unix (1985), but has been retroactively applied to earlier versions as well. Prior to V8, the operating system was most commonly called simply UNIX (in caps) or the UNIX Time-Sharing System.

Ancient UNIX is any early release of the Unix code base prior to Unix System III, particularly the Research Unix releases prior to and including Version 7 (the base for UNIX/32V as well as later developments of AT&T Unix).

== History ==
AT&T licensed Version 5 to educational institutions, and Version 6 also to commercial sites. Schools paid $200 and others $20,000, discouraging most commercial use, but Version 6 was the most widely used version into the 1980s. Research Unix versions are often referred to by the edition of the manual that describes them, because early versions and the last few were never officially released outside of Bell Labs, and grew organically. So, the first Research Unix would be the First Edition, and the last the Tenth Edition. Another common way of referring to them is as "Version x Unix" or "Vx Unix", where x is the manual edition. All modern editions of Unix—excepting Unix-like implementations such as Coherent, Minix, and Linux—derive from the 7th Edition.

Starting with the 8th Edition, versions of Research Unix had a close relationship to BSD. This began by using 4.1cBSD as the basis for the 8th Edition. In a Usenet post from 2000, Dennis Ritchie described these later versions of Research Unix as being closer to BSD than they were to UNIX System V, which also included some BSD code:

Research Unix 8th Edition started from (I think) BSD 4.1c, but with enormous amounts scooped out and replaced by our own stuff. This continued with 9th and 10th. The ordinary user command-set was, I guess, a bit more BSD-flavored than SysVish, but it was pretty eclectic.

== Versions ==
Manual Edition	Release date	Description
1st Edition	Nov 3, 1971	First edition of the Unix manual, based on the version that ran on the PDP-11 at the time. The operating system was two years old, having been ported from the PDP-7 to the PDP-11/20 in 1970. Includes ar, as, bcd, cal, cat, chdir, chmod, chown, cmp, cp, date, dc, df, du, ed, glob, init, ld, ln, ls, mail, mesg, mkdir, mkfs, mount, mv, nm, od, pr, rm, rmdir, roff, sh, sort, stat, strip, su, sum, tty, umount, wc, who, write; also precursors of fsck, reboot, and adb. The system also had a B and Fortran compiler, a BASIC interpreter, device files and functions for managing punched tape, DECtape, and RK05 disks.
2nd Edition	Jun 12, 1972	Total number of installations at the time was 10, "with more expected", according to the preface of the manual. Adds echo, exit, login, m6 macro processor, man, nroff, strip, stty, tmg compiler-compiler and the first C compiler.
3rd Edition	Feb 1973	Introduced a C debugger, pipes, crypt, kill, passwd, size, speak, split, uniq, and yacc. Commands are split between /bin and /usr/bin, requiring a search path (/usr was the mount point for a second hard disk). Total number of installations was 16.
4th Edition	Nov 1973	First version written in C. Also introduced comm, dump, file, grep, nice, nohup, ps, sleep, sync, tr, wait, and printf(3). Included a SNOBOL interpreter. Number of installations was listed as "above 20". The manual was formatted with troff for the first time. Version described in Thompson and Ritchie's CACM paper, the first public exposition of the operating system.
5th Edition	Jun 1974	Version 5 Unix for the PDP-11, running on SIMH Licensed to selected educational institutions. Introduced col, dd, diff, eqn, find, lpr, pwd, spell, tee, and the sticky bit. Targeted the PDP-11/40 and other 11 models with 18 bit addresses. Installations "above 50".
6th Edition	May 1975	Version 6 Unix for the PDP-11, running in SIMH Includes bc, chgrp, cron, newgrp, ptrace(2), ratfor, tbl, units, and wall. First version widely available outside of Bell Laboratories, licensed to commercial users, and to be ported to non-PDP hardware (Interdata 7/32). May 1977 saw the release of MINI-UNIX, a "cut down" v6 for the low-end PDP-11/10.
7th Edition	Jan 1979	Version 7 Unix for the PDP-11, running in SIMH Includes the Bourne shell, ioctl(2), stdio(3), and pcc augmenting Dennis Ritchie's C compiler. Adds adb, at, awk, banner, basename, cu, diff3, expr, f77, factor, fortune, iostat, join, lex, lint, look, m4, make, rev, sed, tabs, tail, tar, test, touch, true, false, tsort, uucp, uux. The ancestor of UNIX System III and the last release of Research Unix to see widespread external distributions. Merged most of the utilities of PWB/UNIX with an extensively modified kernel with almost 80% more lines of code than V6. Ported to PDP-11, Interdata 8/32 and VAX (UNIX/32V). 32V was the basis for 3BSD.
8th Edition	Feb 1985	Based on 4.1BSD and System V for the VAX, with a System V shell and sockets replaced by Streams. Used internally, and only licensed for educational use. Adds Berkeley DB, curses(3), cflow, clear, compress, cpio, csh, cut, ksh (Internal AT&T builds only), last, netstat, netnews, seq, telnet, tset, ul, vi, vmstat. The Blit graphics terminal became the primary user interface. Includes Lisp, Pascal and Altran. Added a network file system that allowed accessing remote computers' files as /n/hostname/path, and a regular expression library that introduced an API later mimicked by Henry Spencer's reimplementation. First version with no assembly in the documentation.
9th Edition	Sep 1986	Incorporated code from 4.3BSD; used internally. Featured a generalized version of the Streams IPC mechanism introduced in V8. The mount system call was extended to connect a stream to a file, the other end of which could be connected to a (user-level) program. This mechanism was used to implement network connection code in user space. Other innovations include Sam. According to Dennis Ritchie, V9 and V10 were "conceptual": manuals existed, but no OS distributions "in complete and coherent form".
10th Edition	Oct 1989	Last Research Unix. Although the manual was published outside of AT&T by Saunders College Publishing, there was no full distribution of the system itself. Novelties included graphics typesetting tools designed to work with troff, a C interpreter, animation programs, and several tools later found in Plan 9: the Mk build tool and the rc shell. V10 was also the basis for Doug McIlroy and James A. Reeds' multilevel-secure operating system IX.
Plan 9	1992	Plan 9 is a successor operating system to Research Unix developed by Bell Laboratories Computing Science Research Center (CSRC).
Inferno	1997	Inferno is a descendant of Plan 9, and shares many design concepts and even source code in the kernel, particularly around devices and the Styx/9P2000 protocol. It shares with Plan 9 the Unix heritage from Bell Labs and the Unix philosophy.

== Licensing ==
After the publication of the Lions' book, work was undertaken to release earlier versions of the codebase. SCO first released the code under a limited educational license.

Later, in January 2002, Caldera International (later to become SCO Group and made defunct) relicensed (but has not made available) several versions under the four-clause BSD license, up to and including Version 7 Unix (UNIX/32V). As of 2022, there has been no widespread use of the code, but it can be used on emulator systems, and Version 5 Unix runs on the Nintendo Game Boy Advance using the SIMH PDP-11 emulator. Version 6 Unix provides the basis for the MIT xv6 teaching system, which is an update of that version to ANSI C and the x86 or RISC-V platform.

The BSD vi text editor is based on code from the ed line editor in those early Unixes. Therefore, "traditional" vi could not be distributed freely, and various work-alikes (such as nvi) were created. Now that the original code is no longer encumbered, the "traditional" vi has been adapted for modern Unix-like operating systems.

SCO Group, Inc. was previously called Caldera International. As a result of the SCO Group, Inc. v. Novell, Inc. case, Novell, Inc. was found not to have transferred the copyrights of UNIX to SCO Group, Inc. Concerns have been raised regarding the validity of the Caldera license.

== The Unix Heritage Society ==
The Unix Heritage Society was founded by Warren Toomey. First edition Unix was restored to a usable state by a restoration team from the Unix Heritage Society in 2008. The restoration process started with paper listings of the source code which were in PDP-11 assembly language.

== Legacy ==
In 2002, Caldera International released Unix V1, V2, V3, V4, V5, V6, V7 on PDP-11 and Unix 32V on VAX as FOSS under a permissive BSD-like software license.

In 2017, The Unix Heritage Society and Alcatel-Lucent USA Inc., on behalf of itself and Nokia Bell Laboratories, released V8, V9, and V10 under the condition that only non-commercial use was allowed, and that they would not assert copyright claims against such use.

== See also ==
- History of Unix
- List of Unix systems
