= Qshell =

Optional command-line interpreter for the IBM

- Developer(s): IBM
- Operating system: IBM i
- Platform: IBM Power Systems
- Standard(s): POSIX, X/Open
- Available in: English
- Type: Command shell
- Website: Qshell

Qshell is an optional command-line interpreter (shell) for the IBM i operating system. Qshell is based on POSIX and X/Open standards. It is a Bourne-like shell that also includes features of KornShell. The utilities (or commands) are external programs that provide additional functions. The development team of Qshell had to deal with platform-specific issues such as translating between ASCII and EBCDIC. The shell supports interactive mode as well as batch processing and can run shell scripts from Unix-like operating systems with few or no modifications.

== Commands ==
The following is a list of commands that are supported by the Qshell command-line interpreter on IBM i 7.4.

- ajar
- alias
- appletviewer
- attr
- basename
- break
- builtin
- cat
- catsplf
- cd
- chgrp
- chmod
- chown
- clrtmp
- cmp
- colon (:)
- command
- compress
- continue
- cp
- cut
- dataq
- datarea
- date
- db2profc
- db2profp
- declare
- dirname
- dot (.)
- dspmsg
- echo
- egrep
- env
- eval
- exec
- exit
- export
- expr
- extcheck
- false
- fgrep
- file
- find
- gencat
- getconf
- getjobid
- getopts
- grep
- hash
- head
- help
- hostname
- iconv
- id
- ipcrm
- ipcs
- jar
- jarsigner
- java
- javac
- javadoc
- javah
- javakey
- javap
- jobs
- kdestroy
- keytab
- keytool
- kill
- kinit
- klist
- ksetup
- ldapadd
- ldapchangepwd
- ldapdelete
- ldapdiff
- ldapexop
- ldapmodify
- ldapmodrdn
- ldapsearch
- let
- liblist
- ln
- local
- locale
- logger
- logname
- ls
- mkdir
- mkfifo
- mv
- native2ascii
- nohup
- od
- pax
- policytool
- pr
- print
- printenv
- printf
- profconv
- profdb
- profp
- ps
- pwd
- pwdx
- qsh
- read
- readonly
- return
- rexec
- rexx
- Rfile
- rm
- rmdir
- rmic
- rmid
- rmiregistry
- sed
- serialver
- set
- setccsid
- sh
- shift
- sleep
- sort
- source
- split
- sqlj
- system
- sysval
- tail
- tar
- tee
- test
- tnameserv
- touch
- tr
- trap
- true
- type
- typeset
- ulimit
- umask
- unalias
- uname
- uncompress
- uniq
- unset
- wait
- wc
- whence
- xargs
- zcat

== Differences from other Unix shells ==
Qshell does not support the <> redirection operator or provide a command history. It also has no job control support as IBM i operating system does not have the concept of a foreground or background process group. The POSIX standard fg and bg built-in commands are therefore not available as well.

== Compared to PASE for i ==
According to IBM, QSHELL is a “Unix-like” interface built over IBM i. The commands issued by the user point to programs in a “Qshell” library. It began as a port from the ash shell, which was a Bourne-like shell created by Berkeley Software Design.

== See also ==
- Control Language
- Comparison of command shells
