= Util-linux =

Package of Linux utilities from the Linux Kernel Organization

util-linux
- Stable release: 2.42 / 1 April 2026; 1 day ago
- Written in: C
- Operating system: Linux
- Available in: 31 languages, 7 full translations
- Type: Utility software
- License: Portions variously under GNU General Public License (v2+ or v2 only), GNU Lesser General Public License (v2+) and BSD License.
- Website: www.kernel.org/pub/linux/utils/util-linux/ git.kernel.org/cgit/utils/util-linux/util-linux.git
- Repository: github.com/util-linux/util-linux

util-linux is a package of utilities distributed by the Linux Kernel Organization for use in a Linux operating system. A fork, util-linux-ng (with ng meaning "next generation"), was created when development stalled, but as of January 2011 has been renamed back to util-linux, and is the official version of the package.

== Content ==
The package includes the following utilities:

- addpart
- agetty
- bits
- blkdiscard
- blkid
- blkpr
- blkzone
- blockdev
- cal
- cfdisk
- chcpu
- chfn
- chmem
- choom
- chrt
- chsh
- col (legacy)
- colcrt
- colrm
- column
- copyfilerange
- coresched
- ctrlaltdel
- delpart
- dmesg
- eject
- enosys
- exch
- fadvise
- fallocate
- fdformat
- fdisk
- fincore
- findfs
- findmnt
- flock
- fsck
- fsck.cramfs
- fsck.minix
- fsfreeze
- fstrim
- getino
- getopt
- hardlink
- hexdump
- hwclock (Note: cquery and set the hardware clock (RTC))
- ionice
- ipcmk
- ipcrm
- ipcs
- irqtop
- isosize
- kill
- last
- lastlog2
- ldattach
- line (legacy)
- logger
- login
- look
- losetup
- lsblk
- lsclocks
- lscpu
- lsfd (Note: modern replacement for lsof)
- lsipc
- lsirq
- lslocks
- lslogins
- lsmem
- lsns
- mcookie
- mesg
- mkfs (legacy)
- mkfs.bfs
- mkfs.cramfs
- mkfs.minix
- mkswap
- more
- mount
- mountpoint
- namei
- newgrp
- nologin
- nsenter
- partx
- pg (legacy)
- pipesz
- pivot_root
- prlimit
- raw
- readprofile
- rename
- renice
- reset (legacy)
- resizepart
- rev
- rfkill
- rtcwake
- runuser
- script
- scriptlive
- scriptreplay
- setarch (Note: including architecture symlinks such as i386, linux32, linux64, x86_64, etc.)
- setpgid
- setpriv
- setsid
- setterm
- sfdisk
- su
- sulogin
- swaplabel
- swapoff
- swapon
- switch_root
- taskset
- tunelp (deprecated)
- uclampset
- ul
- umount
- unshare
- utmpdump
- uuidd
- uuidgen
- uuidparse
- vipw (Note: including symlink to vigr)
- waitpid
- wall
- wdctl
- whereis
- wipefs
- write
- zramctl

== Removed content ==
Utilities formerly included, but removed as of 1 July 2015:

- arch
- chkdupexe
- clock
- cytune
- ddate (Note: removed from default build before being removed altogether)
- elvtune
- fastboot
- fasthalt
- halt
- initctl
- ramsize (Note: formerly a symlink to rdev)
- rdev
- reboot
- rootflags
- shutdown
- simpleinit
- tailf
- vidmode

== See also ==
- BusyBox – Collection of Unix commands in a single executable file
- CUPS – Computer printing system
- GNU Core Utilities – Collection of standard, Unix-based utilities from GNU
- Toybox – Collection of Unix tools in single executable file
- uname – Standard UNIX utility that prints name and other details about the machine
