= Whereis =

Command on Unix and Unix-like operating systems

whereis is a command on Unix and Unix-like operating systems used to locate some special files of a command like the binary file, source and manual page files. The whereis utility was first included with 2BSD, dating back to 1979.

== Syntax ==
The whereis man page provides the following sample usage:

% # Find all files in /usr/bin which are not documented in /usr/man/man1 with source in /usr/src:
% cd /usr/bin
% whereis -u -M /usr/man/man1 -S /usr/src -f *

== Analogs ==
The Unix type command is similar, but it identifies aliases.

Modern versions of Microsoft Windows feature a similar command: where.

It's also similar to the where utility in Multics.

== See also ==
- List of Unix commands
- command (shell builtin)
- which (command)
- type (Unix)
- hash (Unix)
