= WTMP =

WTMP may refer to:

- WTMP (AM), a radio station (1150 AM) licensed to serve Egypt Lake, Florida, United States
- WTMP-FM, a radio station (96.1 FM) licensed to serve Dade City, Florida
- Utmp, the UNIX wimp file
