= Conky (software) =

System monitor for the X Window System

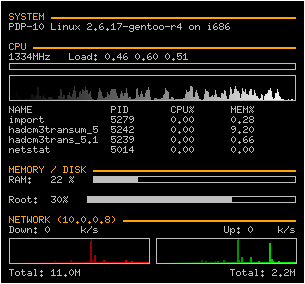
- A typical Conky appearance
- Original author: Brenden Matthews
- Stable release: 1.24.0 / 1 June 2026; 8 days ago
- Written in: C, C++
- Operating system: Linux, FreeBSD, and OpenBSD
- Type: System monitor
- License: GPL and BSD licenses
- Website: conky.cc
- Repository: github.com/brndnmtthws/conky

Conky is a free software desktop system monitor for the X Window System. It is available for Linux, FreeBSD, and OpenBSD. Conky is highly configurable and is able to monitor many system variables including the status of the CPU, memory, swap space, disk storage, temperatures, processes, network interfaces, battery power, system messages, e-mail inboxes, Arch Linux updates, many popular music players (MPD, XMMS2, BMPx, Audacious, etc.), weather updates, breaking news, and much more. Unlike system monitors that use high-level widget toolkits to render their information, Conky is drawn directly in an X window. This allows it to be configured such that it consumes relatively few system resources.

Conky was hailed as "one of the best maintained, and definitely one of the most useful, programs in the world of open source" in Linux Magazine.

It comes pre-configured in the default installation of Pinguy OS and CrunchBang Linux.

== History ==
Conky is a fork of torsmo, a system monitor that is no longer maintained. Torsmo, however, continues to be used in systems where applications that use minimal resources are preferred. Damn Small Linux, for example, runs torsmo in its desktop root window on the default installation of its Live CD. Conky derives its name from a character in the Canadian television programme Trailer Park Boys.

== Common uses ==
While Conky is suited for use as a system monitor, it can also be used to gather and display many other sources of information and can be extended with the Lua programming language.

Conky has also been ported to devices such as the Nokia N900 and can be ported to practically any system with GCC and an X11 implementation.

Users have created and distributed many customized scripts, demonstrating Conky's modularity and versatility in function and appearance. A thread on the Ubuntu forums has grown to over 2,000 pages of users sharing their configurations.

== Usage example ==
A simple configuration for Conky which displays the time on a user's desktop is as follows:

Note: As of version 1.10 Conky has changed the syntax used.

conky.config = {
    alignment = 'middle_middle',
    background = false,
    border_width = 1,
    cpu_avg_samples = 2,
	default_color = 'white',
    default_outline_color = 'white',
    default_shade_color = 'white',
    draw_borders = false,
    draw_graph_borders = true,
    draw_outline = false,
    draw_shades = false,
    use_xft = true,
    font = 'Free Mono:size=30',
    gap_x = 5,
    gap_y = 60,
    minimum_height = 5,
	minimum_width = 400,
    net_avg_samples = 2,
    no_buffers = true,
    out_to_console = false,
    out_to_stderr = false,
    extra_newline = false,
    own_window = true,
    own_window_class = 'Conky',
    own_window_type = 'desktop',
    stippled_borders = 0,
    update_interval = 1.0,
    uppercase = false,
    use_spacer = 'none',
    show_graph_scale = false,
    show_graph_range = false
}

conky.text = [[
${time %H:%M}
]]

A simpler example of the old syntax:

update_interval 30

own_window yes
own_window_type desktop

use_xft yes
xftfont DejaVu Sans:size=14

alignment bottom_right

TEXT
${time %H:%M}

Default configuration file location is $HOME/.conkyrc or ${sysconfdir}/conky/conky.conf. On most systems, "sysconfdir" is /etc, and you can find the sample configuration file there (/etc/conky/conky.conf).

== Screenshots ==
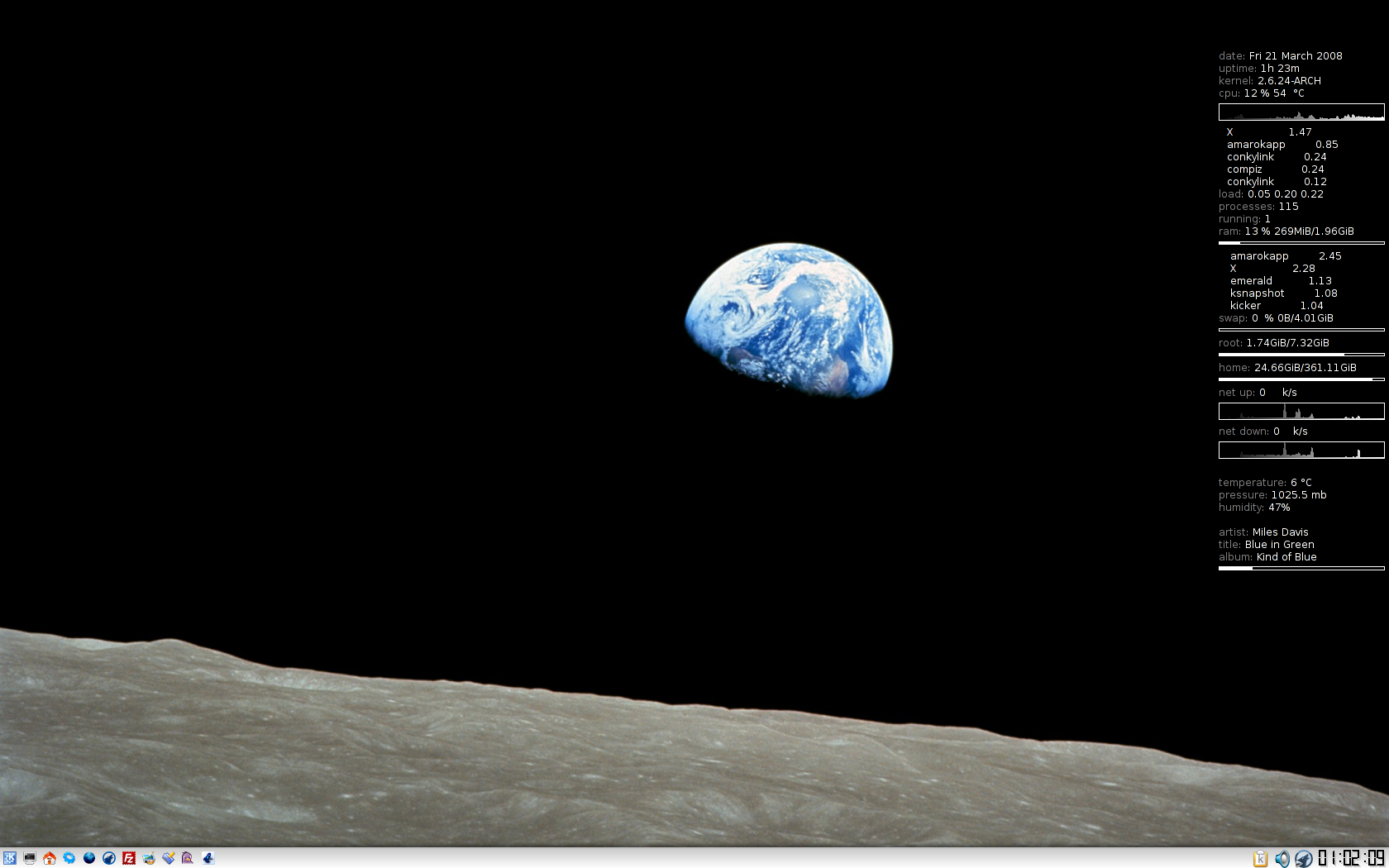
Conky on Arch Linux

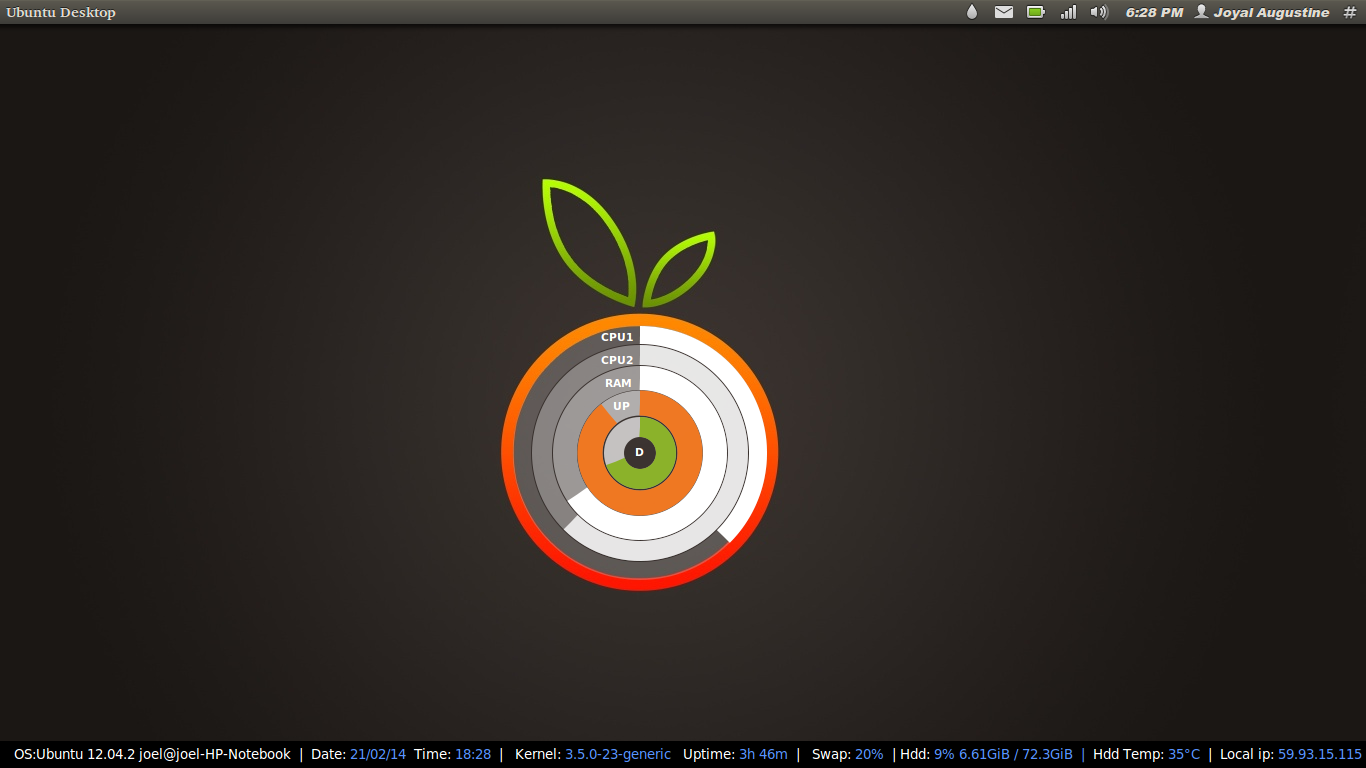
Conky on Ubuntu

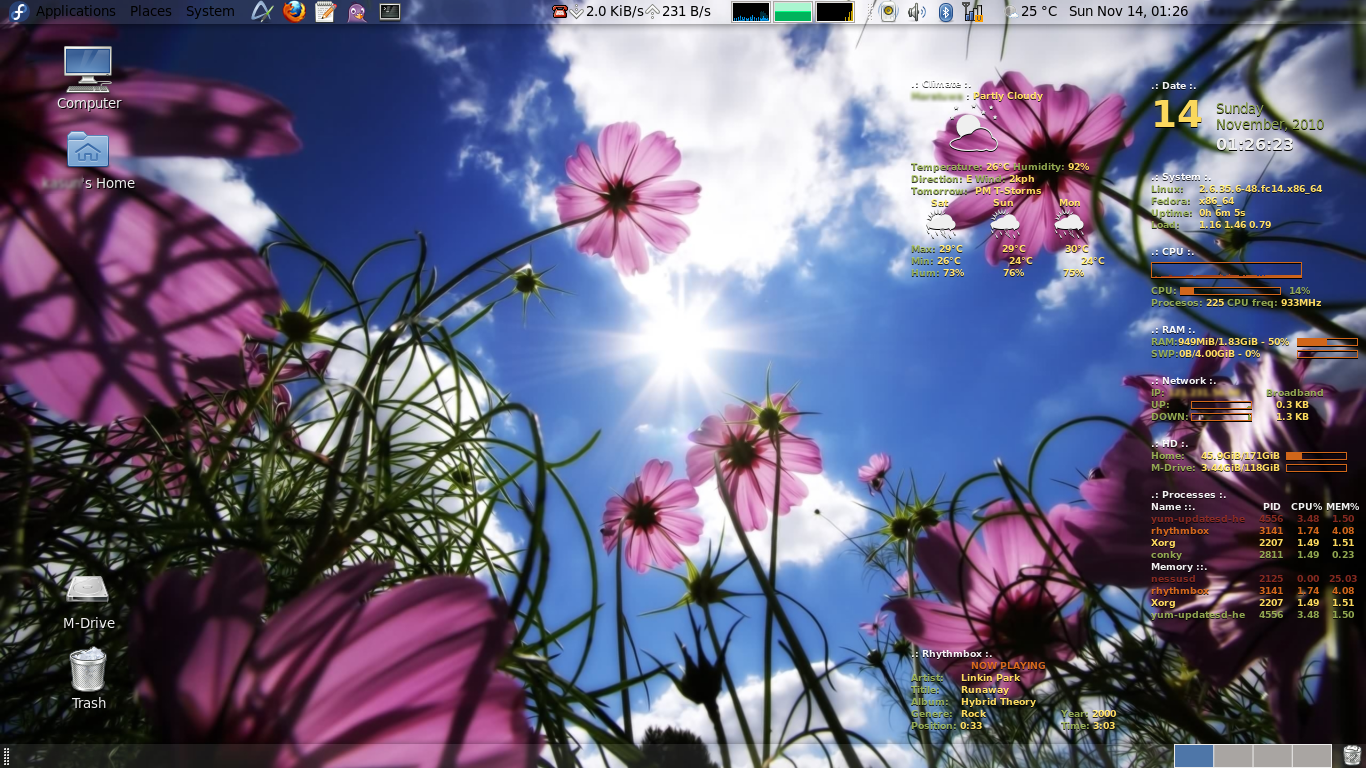
Conky on Fedora 14 (Laughlin)

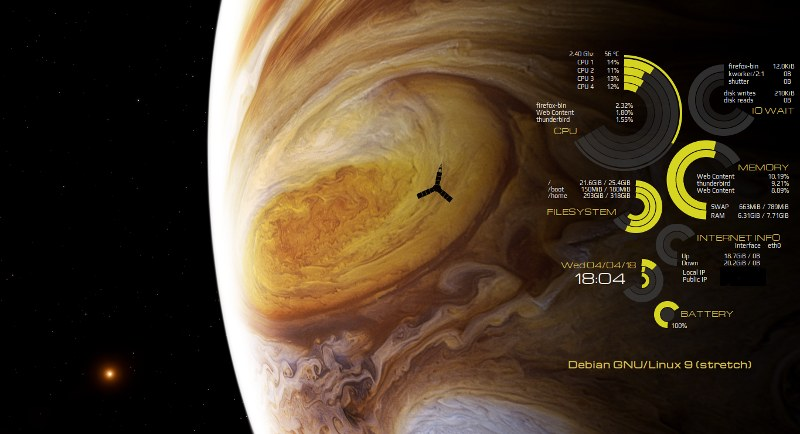
Conky with lua on Debian

== See also ==
- GKrellM
