= Shuf =

1991 GNU Unix command

shuf
- Operating system: Unix and Unix-like
- Platform: Cross-platform
- Type: Command
- License: coreutils: GNU GPL v3

shuf is a command-line utility included in the textutils package of GNU Core Utilities for creating a standard output consisting of random permutations of the input.

The version of shuf bundled in GNU coreutils was written by Paul Eggert. It is not a part of POSIX.

== Example ==
$ ls
Wikibooks  Wikipedia  Wiktionary
$ # Shuffles input 
$ ls | shuf 
Wikipedia
Wiktionary
Wikibooks
$ # Picks one random line from input
$ ls | shuf -n1
Wikipedia

== See also ==
- sort -R
- sort --random-sort
