= Mesg =

Unix command

mesg
- Original authors: Dennis Ritchie, Ken Thompson
- Developer: AT&T Bell Laboratories
- Initial release: November 3, 1971; 54 years ago
- Operating system: Unix and Unix-like
- Type: Command

mesg is a Unix command that sets or reports the permission other users have to write to the current user's terminal using the talk and write commands.

== Usage ==
It is invoked as:

mesg [y|n]

The 'y' and 'n' options respectively allow and disallow write access to the current user's terminal. When invoked with no option, the current permission is printed.

Input redirection may be used to control the permission of another TTY. For example:

% mesg
is y
% tty
/dev/tty1
% mesg < /dev/tty2
is y
% mesg n < /dev/tty2
% mesg < /dev/tty2
is n
% mesg
is y

== See also ==
- List of Unix commands
