= Write (Unix) =

Unix command to send messages to another user by writing directly to their terminal

write
- Original authors: Dennis Ritchie, Ken Thompson
- Developer: AT&T Bell Laboratories
- Initial release: November 3, 1971; 54 years ago
- Operating system: Unix and Unix-like
- Platform: Cross-platform
- Type: Command

In Unix and Unix-like operating systems, write is a utility used to send messages to another user by writing a message directly to another user's TTY.

== History ==
The write command was included in the First Edition of the Research Unix operating system. A similar command appeared in Compatible Time-Sharing System.

== Sample usage ==
The syntax for the write command is:

$ write user [tty]
message

The write session is terminated by sending EOF, which can be done by pressing Ctrl+D. The tty argument is only necessary when a user is logged into more than one terminal.

A conversation initiated between two users on the same machine:

$ write root pts/7
Hello!

Will show up to the user on that console as:

Message from root@wiki on pts/8 at 11:19 ...
Hello!

== See also ==
- List of Unix commands
- talk (Unix)
- wall (Unix)
