= Sort (Unix) =

Standard UNIX utility

sort
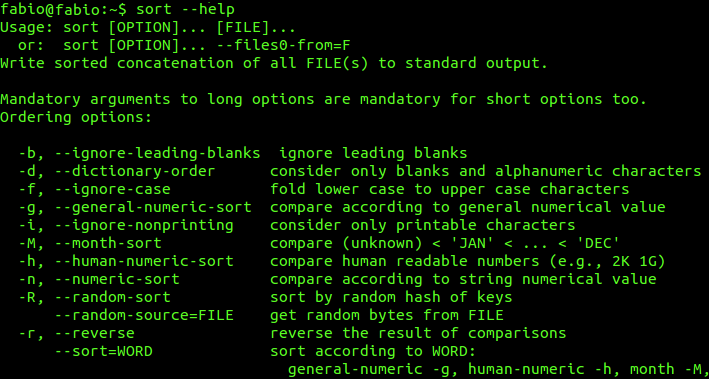
- The sort command
- Original author: Ken Thompson (AT&T Bell Laboratories)
- Developers: Various open-source and commercial developers
- Release: November 3, 1971; 54 years ago
- Written in: C
- Operating system: Multics, Unix, Unix-like, V, Plan 9, Inferno, MSX-DOS, IBM i
- Platform: Cross-platform
- Type: Command
- License: coreutils: GPLv3+ Plan 9: MIT License

In computing, sort is a standard command line program of Unix and Unix-like operating systems, that prints the lines of its input or concatenation of all files listed in its argument list in sorted order. Sorting is done based on one or more sort keys extracted from each line of input. By default, the entire input is taken as sort key. Blank space is the default field separator. The command supports a number of command-line options that can vary by implementation. For instance the "-r" flag will reverse the sort order. Sort ordering is affected by the environment's locale settings.

== History ==
A sort command that invokes a general sort facility was first implemented within Multics. Later, it appeared in Version 1 Unix. This version was originally written by Ken Thompson at AT&T Bell Laboratories. By Version 4 Thompson had modified it to use pipes, but sort retained an option to name the output file because it was used to sort a file in place. In Version 5, Thompson invented "-" to represent standard input.

sort is part of X/Open Portability Guide Issue 2 (1987). From there it was inherited into POSIX.

The version of sort bundled in GNU coreutils was written by Mike Haertel and Paul Eggert. This implementation employs the mergesort algorithm. It offers an option to sort in parallel, though performance gain diminishes after 8 threads. GNU parallel also provides a wrapper to perform parallel invocations of sort with similar performance-gain characteristics: on a 48-core system, the speedup is about 3×.

The sort command has also been ported to the IBM i operating system, being accessible from the POSIX-compatible Qshell.

=== Non-POSIX ports ===
Similar commands are available on many other operating systems, for example a sort command is part of ASCII's MSX-DOS2 Tools for MSX-DOS version 2.

The "uutils" project provides a cross-platform implementation of sort written in Rust, with support for all of GNU coreutil's options. It uses the par_sort_by or par_sort_unstable_by function of Rayon, the Rust multi-threading library, implementing either an adaptive mergesort inspired by timsort or a variation of pattern-defeating quicksort.

== Syntax ==
sort [OPTION]... [FILE]...

With no FILE, or when FILE is -, the command reads from standard input.

=== Parameters ===
In the table below, "Short" indicates only support for the one-letter (short) form of the option. Long options are originally a GNU extension and is not part of any version of SUS or POSIX. It has since also been adopted by FreeBSD.

Name	Description	SUS/POSIX	Plan 9	Inferno	FreeBSD	Linux	MSX-DOS	IBM i
-b, --ignore-leading-blanks	roIgnores leading blanks.	Short	Short	No	Yes	Yes	No	Short
-c, --check	Check that input file is sorted.	No	Short	No	Yes	Yes	No	Short
-C, --check=<silent|quiet>	Like -c, but does not report the first bad line.	No	No	No	Yes	Yes	No	No
-d, --dictionary-order	Considers only blanks and alphanumeric characters.	Short	Short	No	Yes	Yes	No	Short
-f, --ignore-case	Fold lower case to upper case characters.	Short	Short	No	Yes	Yes	No	Short
-g, --general-numeric-sort, --sort=general-numeric	Compares according to general numerical value.	Short	Short	No	Yes	Yes	No	No
-h, --human-numeric-sort, --sort=human-numeric	Compare human readable numbers (e.g., 2K 1G).	Short	No	No	Yes	Yes	No	No
-i, --ignore-nonprinting	Considers only printable characters.	Short	Short	No	Yes	Yes	No	Short
-k, --key=POS1[,POS2]	Start a key at POS1 (origin 1), end it at POS2 (default end of line)	No	No	No	Yes	Yes	No	No
-m	Merge only; input files are assumed to be presorted.	No	Short	No	Yes	Yes	No	Short
-M, --month-sort, --sort=month	Compares (unknown) < 'JAN' < ... < 'DEC'.	Short	Short	No	Yes	Yes	No	No
-n, --numeric-sort, --sort=numeric	Compares according to string numerical value.	Short	Short	Short	Yes	Yes	No	Short
-o OUTPUT	Uses OUTPUT file instead of standard output.	No	Short	No	Yes	Yes	No	Short
-r, --reverse	Reverses the result of comparisons.	Short	Short	Short	Yes	Yes	No	Short
-R, --random-sort, --sort=random	Shuffles, but groups identical keys. See also: shuf	No	No	No	Yes	Yes	No	No
-s	Stabilizes sort by disabling last-resort comparison.	No	No	No	Yes	Yes	No	No
-S size, --buffer-size=size	Use size for the maximum size of the memory buffer.	No	No	No	Yes	No	No	No
-t char, --field-separator=char	Uses char instead of non-blank to blank transition. In other words, 'Tab character' separating fields is char.	No	Short	No	Yes	Yes	No	Short
-T dir, --temporary-directory=dir	Uses dir for temporaries.	No	Short	No	Yes	Yes	No	No
-u, --unique	Unique processing to suppress all but one in each set of lines having equal keys.	No	Short	No	Yes	Yes	No	Short
-V, --version-sort	Natural sort of (version) numbers within text	No	No	No	Yes	Yes	No	No
-w	Like -i, but ignore only tabs and spaces.	No	Yes	No	No	No	No	No
-z, --zero-terminated	End lines with 0 byte, not newline	No	No	No	Yes	Yes	No	No
--help	Display help and exit	No	No	No	Yes	Yes	No	No
--version	Output version information and exit	No	No	No	Yes	Yes	No	No
/R	Reverses the result of comparisons.	No	No	No	No	No	Yes	No
/S	Specify the number of digits to determine how many digits of each line should be judged.	No	No	No	No	No	Yes	No
/A	Sort by ASCII code.	No	No	No	No	No	Yes	No
/H	Include hidden files when using wild cards.	No	No	No	No	No	Yes	No

== Examples ==
=== Sort a file in alphabetical order ===
$ cat phonebook
Smith, Brett     555-4321
Doe, John        555-1234
Doe, Jane        555-3214
Avery, Cory      555-4132
Fogarty, Suzie   555-2314

$ sort phonebook
Avery, Cory      555-4132
Doe, Jane        555-3214
Doe, John        555-1234
Fogarty, Suzie   555-2314
Smith, Brett     555-4321

=== Sort by number ===
The -n option makes the program sort according to numerical value. The du command produces output that starts with a number, the file size, so its output can be piped to sort to produce a list of files sorted by (ascending) file size:

$ du /bin/* | sort -n
4       /bin/domainname
24      /bin/ls
102     /bin/sh
304     /bin/csh

The find command with the ls option prints file sizes in the 7th field, so a list of the LaTeX files sorted by file size is produced by:

$ find . -name "*.tex" -ls | sort -k 7n

=== Columns or fields ===
Use the -k option to sort on a certain column. For example, use "-k 2" to sort on the second column. In old versions of sort, the +1 option made the program sort on the second column of data (+2 for the third, etc.). This usage is deprecated.

$ cat zipcode
Adam  12345
Bob   34567
Joe   56789
Sam   45678
Wendy 23456

$ sort -k 2n zipcode
Adam  12345
Wendy 23456
Bob   34567
Sam   45678
Joe   56789

=== Sort on multiple fields ===
The -k m,n option lets you sort on a key that is potentially composed of multiple fields (start at column m, end at column n):

$ cat quota
fred 2000
bob 1000
an 1000
chad 1000
don 1500
eric 500

$ sort -k2,2n -k1,1 quota
eric 500
an 1000
bob 1000
chad 1000
don 1500
fred 2000

Here the first sort is done using column 2. -k2,2n specifies sorting on the key starting and ending with column 2, and sorting numerically. If -k2 is used instead, the sort key would begin at column 2 and extend to the end of the line, spanning all the fields in between. -k1,1 dictates breaking ties using the value in column 1, sorting alphabetically by default. Note that bob, and chad have the same quota and are sorted alphabetically in the final output.

=== Sorting a pipe delimited file ===
$ sort -k2,2,-k1,1 -t'|' zipcode
Adam|12345
Wendy|23456
Sam|45678
Joe|56789
Bob|34567

=== Sorting a tab delimited file ===
Sorting a file with tab separated values requires a tab character to be specified as the column delimiter. This illustration uses the shell's dollar-quote notation to specify the tab as a C escape sequence.

$ sort -k2,2 -t $'\t' phonebook 
Doe, John	555-1234
Fogarty, Suzie	555-2314
Doe, Jane	555-3214
Avery, Cory	555-4132
Smith, Brett	555-4321

=== Sort in reverse ===
The -r option just reverses the order of the sort:

$ sort -rk 2n zipcode
Joe   56789
Sam   45678
Bob   34567
Wendy 23456
Adam  12345

=== Sort in random ===
The GNU implementation has a -R --random-sort option based on hashing; this is not a full random shuffle because it will sort identical lines together. A true random sort is provided by the Unix utility shuf.

=== Sort by version ===
The GNU implementation has a -V --version-sort option which is a natural sort of (version) numbers within text. Two text strings that are to be compared are split into blocks of letters and blocks of digits. Blocks of letters are compared alpha-numerically, and blocks of digits are compared numerically (i.e., skipping leading zeros, more digits means larger, otherwise the leftmost digits that differ determine the result). Blocks are compared left-to-right and the first non-equal block in that loop decides which text is larger. This happens to work for IP addresses, Debian package version strings and similar tasks where numbers of variable length are embedded in strings.

== See also ==
- Collation
- List of Unix commands
- uniq
- shuf
- join (Unix)
