= Cflow =

GNU cflow
- Developer: GNU Project
- Stable release: 1.8 / 30 July 2025; 6 months ago
- Operating system: Linux, UNIX
- Type: Flowgraph generator
- License: GPL (free software)
- Website: gnu.org/software/cflow/
- Repository: git.savannah.gnu.org/cgit/cflow.git

cflow is a POSIX-defined shell command for generating a C-language flow graph. The GNU implementation reads C source code files, and generates a flow graph of external references. It uses only source files and does not need to run the program. Another implementation is available in Tru64 Unix.

== See also ==
- List of POSIX commands
