= Ipcs =

ipcs
- Developers: Various open-source and commercial developers
- Operating system: Unix, Unix-like, IBM i
- Type: Command

ipcs is a Unix and Linux command to list System V InterProcess Communication System's API kernel entities to stdout. System V IPC kernel entities are:

- Shared memory segments
- Message queues
- Semaphore arrays

== Implementations ==
On Linux, the ipcs command is provided by the util-linux package.

The ipcs command has also been ported to the IBM i operating system.

== See also ==
- List of Unix commands
- ipcrm
