= Full Circle (magazine) =

British computer magazine

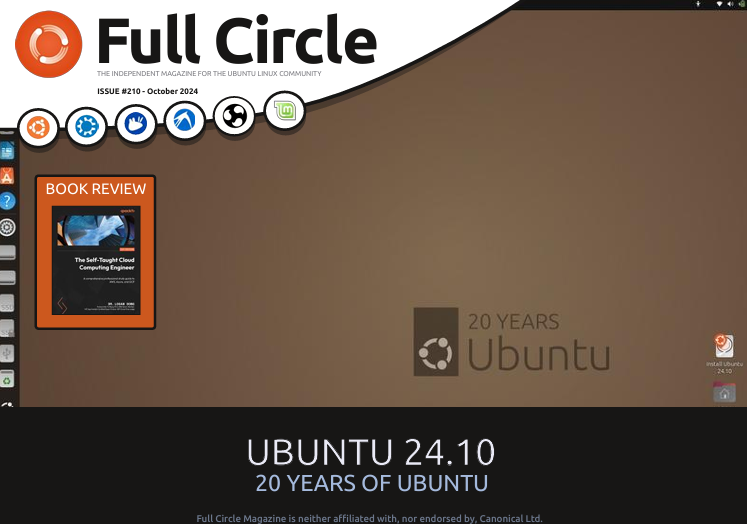
- Cover of issue 210 (October 2024)
- Editor: Ronnie Tucker
- Categories: Linux magazine
- Frequency: Monthly
- First issue: April 2007; 18 years ago
- Company: Full Circle Team
- Country: United Kingdom
- Language: English
- Website: fullcirclemagazine.org

Full Circle is a free distribution Portable Document Format magazine that was founded by Ronnie Tucker in April 2007. It is released on the last Friday of every month in PDF, EPUB ebook format and also on the Issuu electronic publishing platform. The magazine is an independent publication and is not affiliated with Canonical Ltd., the sponsors of the Ubuntu operating system. It relies on volunteer writers for most of its editorial content.

All text and images contained in the magazine are released under the Attribution-By-ShareAlike 3.0 Unported Creative Commons license.

The publication is aimed at users of the Ubuntu operating system and all its derivatives, including Kubuntu, Lubuntu, Xubuntu, Edubuntu, as well as others like Linux Mint and its derivatives. It focuses on product reviews, community news, how-to articles, programming and troubleshooting tips. The latest issue is currently available in 23 languages but that number changes depending on community members willing to translate to their native tongue. The first edition was produced in English, Estonian, Romanian, Italian, Russian, Spanish, Galician, Dutch and Indonesian.

A number of Full Circle Special Editions have been compiled by contributors Robin Catling and Jonathan Hoskin. These group together article series for easy download by readers. Currently there are issues for Inkscape, Python, GIMP, Scribus and LibreOffice.

== History ==
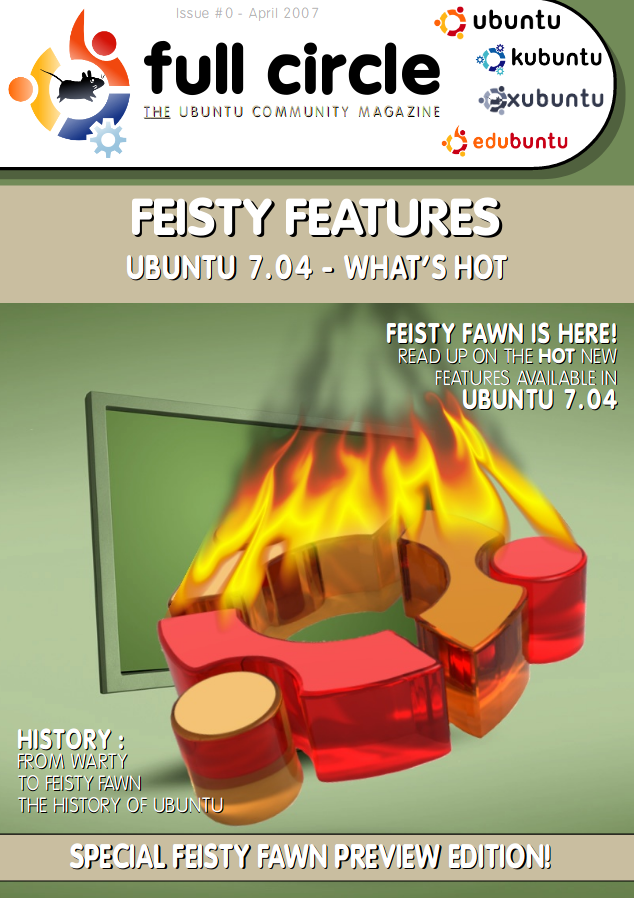
Issue 0 April 2007

The publication was initially proposed by Tucker on 29 March 2007, as a posting on the Ubuntu Forums. Forum participates quickly contributed proposed logos for the new publication.

Issue 0 of Full Circle was released in April 2007 and featured stories about Ubuntu's history, features including desktop effects and new Linux games. This first edition was 17 pages in length, in portrait format.

Issue 1 came out in May 2007 in English, Chinese, Dutch, French, Hungarian, Italian, Polish, Russian and Spanish.

Issue 4 saw a switch to PDF landscape format, for easier viewing on computer screens. By Issue 25 the magazine had grown to 28 pages.

In December 2007, the Full Circle Podcast started. After two episodes, the podcast stopped production, due to the host unable to dedicate time to the podcast. In March 2010, the podcast was re-established by Robin Catling, along with Ed Hewitt and Dave Wilkins, with an entirely new format. Each episode, the podcast covers news, round up of the latest issue of the magazine, interviews, reviews and feedback from listeners.

Issue 40, published in August 2010, saw the magazine update to a new logo from German designer Thorsten Wilms and switch to using Ubuntu font.

In 2010 the publication started partnering with Ubuntu User, a quarterly paper magazine. Each publication provided banner ads for the other, seeing the publications and complementary to each other. Rikki Kite, the Associate Publisher of both Ubuntu User and Linux Pro Magazine wrote, "Ubuntu User magazine and Full Circle are working together to help promote our publications. Full Circle is a monthly online magazine, whereas Ubuntu User is a quarterly print publication. We think that many Ubuntu users will want to read both magazines, so our agreement with Full Circle to cross promote our products seemed like a great way to connect to the growing Ubuntu community."

In 2012 the editorial staff worked together to create the Official Full Circle Style Guide, which gives guidance to contributors to standardize the writing style for submissions.

In July 2012 Les Pounder and the Blackpool Linux User Group took over hosting the podcast, starting with episode 29.

In early 2016 Tucker started the Full Circle Weekly News, a short audiocast. Each episode has up to 20 news items, originally read by Tucker. The hosts changed several times. Leo Chavez took over the show with Episode 127 on April 22, 2019, and since April 6, 2021 (Episode #204) is hosted by Moss Bliss.

In September 2019 Tucker issued a published plea for more material to be submitted by volunteer writers to keep the magazine going. He indicated that a number of long time columnists were coming to the end of their work and other writers would be needed if the publication was to survive.

== Staff ==
The production staff consisted in 2019 of: Editor Ronnie Tucker, Webmaster Lucas Westermann, the editorial staff include Jim Dyer, Mike Kennedy, Gord Campbell, Robert Orsino, Josh Hertel, Bert Jerred, Emily Gonyer, and Podcaster Moss Bliss.

== See also ==
- Ubuntu User
