= List of POSIX commands =

Utilities listed in POSIX.1-2024

This is a list of the shell commands of the most recent version of the Portable Operating System Interface (POSIX) – IEEE Std 1003.1-2024 which is part of the Single UNIX Specification (SUS). These commands are implemented in many shells on modern Unix, Unix-like and other operating systems. This list does not cover commands for all versions of Unix and Unix-like shells nor other versions of POSIX.

As is typical in the context of a POSIX system, the term file refers to an item of a file system which can be a regular file, a directory or several other more specialized types.

Columns:

Command
The text one enters to launch the command.
Category
Functional categorization.
Optionality
Indicates whether the command is mandatory or optional in order to achieve conformance. If the latter, then a code indicates the optional functionality group to which the command belongs.

Batch environment (BE)
Batch job control.
C‑language development (CD)
For developing software in C.
FORTRAN development (FD)
For developing software in FORTRAN.
FORTRAN runtime (FR)
Runtime‑support for FORTRAN.
Software development (SD)
For developing software; not language specific.
User portability (UP)
Addresses consistency at the user interface level.
X/Open System Interfaces (XSI)
Historically UNIX-like features that were common on System V–style systems.

Description
Describes what the command does.
First appeared
Identifies an operating system version in which the command was first provided.

Command	Category	Optionality	Description	First appeared
admin	SCCS	Optional (XSI)	Create and administer SCCS files	PWB UNIX
alias	Misc	Mandatory	Manage command aliases	
ar	Misc	Mandatory	Manage library archives	Version 1 AT&T UNIX
asa	Text processing	Optional (FR)	Interpret carriage-control characters	System V
at	Process management	Mandatory	Execute commands at a later time	Version 7 AT&T UNIX
awk	Text processing	Mandatory	Pattern scanning and processing language	Version 7 AT&T UNIX
basename	Filesystem	Mandatory	Report non-directory portion of a pathname	Version 7 AT&T UNIX
batch	Process management	Mandatory	Schedule commands to be executed in a batch queue	
bc	Misc	Mandatory	Arbitrary-precision arithmetic calculator	Version 6 AT&T UNIX
bg	Process management	Optional (UP)	Move jobs to the background	
cc	C programming	Optional (CD)	Compile C source code	IEEE Std 1003.1-2024
cal	Misc	Optional (XSI)	Print a calendar	Version 5 AT&T UNIX
cat	Filesystem	Mandatory	Concatenate and print files	PDP-7 UNIX
cd	Filesystem	Mandatory	Change the working directory	Version 6 AT&T UNIX
cflow	C programming	Optional (XSI)	Generate a C-language call graph	System V
chgrp	Filesystem	Mandatory	Change file group ownership	PWB UNIX
chmod	Filesystem	Mandatory	Change file modes/attributes/permissions	PDP-7 UNIX
chown	Filesystem	Mandatory	Change file ownership	PDP-7 UNIX
cksum	Filesystem	Mandatory	Report file checksum and size	4.4BSD
cmp	Filesystem	Mandatory	Compare two files	Version 1 AT&T UNIX
comm	Text processing	Mandatory	Select or reject lines common to two files	Version 4 AT&T UNIX
command	Shell programming	Mandatory	Execute a simple command	
compress	Filesystem	Optional (XSI)	Compress data	4.3BSD
cp	Filesystem	Mandatory	Copy files	PDP-7 UNIX
cron	Misc	Mandatory	Schedule periodic background work	System V
csplit	Text processing	Mandatory	Split files based on context	PWB UNIX
ctags	C programming	Optional (SD)	Create a tags file	3BSD
cut	Text processing	Mandatory	Cut out selected fields of each line of a file	System III
cxref	C programming	Optional (XSI)	Generate a C-language program cross-reference table	System V
date	Misc	Mandatory	Report or change system date and time	Version 1 AT&T UNIX
dd	Filesystem	Mandatory	Convert and copy files	Version 5 AT&T UNIX
delta	SCCS	Optional (XSI)	Make a delta (change) to an SCCS file	PWB UNIX
df	Filesystem	Mandatory	Report free storage space	Version 1 AT&T UNIX
diff	Text processing	Mandatory	Compare two files	Version 5 AT&T UNIX
dirname	Filesystem	Mandatory	Report the directory portion of a pathname	System III
du	Filesystem	Mandatory	Estimate file space usage	Version 1 AT&T UNIX
echo	Shell programming	Mandatory	Write to standard output	Version 2 AT&T UNIX
ed	Text processing	Mandatory	The standard text editor	PDP-7 UNIX
env	Misc	Mandatory	Set the environment for command invocation	System III
ex	Text processing	Optional (UP)	Text editor	1BSD
expand	Text processing	Mandatory	Convert tabs to spaces	3BSD
expr	Shell programming	Mandatory	Evaluate arguments as an expression	Version 7 AT&T UNIX
false	Shell programming	Mandatory	Exit immediately with status 1	Version 7 AT&T UNIX
fc	Misc	Optional (UP)	Process the command history list	
fg	Process management	Optional (UP)	Move a job to the foreground	
file	Filesystem	Mandatory	Report type of files	Version 4 AT&T UNIX
find	Filesystem	Mandatory	Find files	Version 1 AT&T UNIX
fold	Text processing	Mandatory	Filter for folding lines	1BSD
fuser	Process management	Optional (XSI)	List process IDs of all processes that have one or more files open	System V
gencat	Misc	Mandatory	Generate a formatted message catalog	
get	SCCS	Optional (XSI)	Get a version of an SCCS file	PWB UNIX
getconf	Misc	Mandatory	Get configuration values	
getopts	Shell programming	Mandatory	Parse utility options	
gettext	Misc	Mandatory	Retrieve text string from messages object	
grep	Misc	Mandatory	Search text for a pattern	Version 4 AT&T UNIX
hash	Misc	Mandatory	Hash database access method	
head	Text processing	Mandatory	Copy the first part of files	PWB UNIX
iconv	Text processing	Mandatory	Codeset conversion	HP-UX
id	Misc	Mandatory	Report user identity	System V
ipcrm	Misc	Optional (XSI)	Remove a message queue, semaphore set, or shared memory segment identifier	System V
ipcs	Misc	Optional (XSI)	Report interprocess communication facilities status	System V
jobs	Process management	Optional (UP)	Report background jobs	
join	Text processing	Mandatory	Merges two sorted text files based on the presence of a common field	Version 7 AT&T UNIX
kill	Process management	Mandatory	Terminate or signal processes	Version 4 AT&T UNIX
lex	C programming	Optional (CD)	Generate programs for lexical tasks	Version 7 AT&T UNIX
link	Filesystem	Optional (XSI)	Create a hard link to a file	Version 1 AT&T UNIX
ln	Filesystem	Mandatory	Link files	Version 1 AT&T UNIX
locale	Misc	Mandatory	Get locale-specific information	
localedef	Misc	Mandatory	Define locale environment	
logger	Shell programming	Mandatory	Log messages	4.3BSD
logname	Misc	Mandatory	Report the user's login name	4.4BSD
lp	Text processing	Mandatory	Send files to a printer	System V
ls	Filesystem	Mandatory	List directory contents	Version 1 AT&T UNIX
m4	Misc	Mandatory	Macro processor	PWB UNIX
mailx	Misc	Mandatory	Process messages	Version 1 AT&T UNIX
make	Programming	Optional (SD)	Maintain, update, and regenerate groups of programs	PWB UNIX
man	Misc	Mandatory	Display system documentation	Version 2 AT&T UNIX
mesg	Misc	Mandatory	Permit or deny messages	Version 1 AT&T UNIX
mkdir	Filesystem	Mandatory	Make directories	Version 1 AT&T UNIX
mkfifo	Filesystem	Mandatory	Make FIFO special files	4.4BSD
more	Text processing	Optional (UP)	Display files on a page-by-page basis	3BSD
msgfmt	Misc	Mandatory	Create messages objects from messages object files	
mv	Filesystem	Mandatory	Move or rename files	Version 1 AT&T UNIX
newgrp	Misc	Mandatory	Change to a new group	Version 6 AT&T UNIX
ngettext	Misc	Mandatory	Retrieve text string from messages object with plural form	
nice	Process management	Mandatory	Invoke a utility with an altered nice value	Version 4 AT&T UNIX
nl	Text processing	Optional (XSI)	Line numbering filter	System III
nm	C programming	Optional (SD, XSI)	Write the name list of an object file	Version 1 AT&T UNIX
nohup	Process management	Mandatory	Invoke a utility immune to hangups	Version 4 AT&T UNIX
od	Misc	Mandatory	Dump files in various formats	Version 1 AT&T UNIX
paste	Text processing	Mandatory	Merge corresponding or subsequent lines of files	Version 32V AT&T UNIX
patch	Text processing	Mandatory	Apply changes to files	4.3BSD
pathchk	Filesystem	Mandatory	Check pathnames	
pax	Misc	Mandatory	Portable archive interchange	4.4BSD
pr	Text processing	Mandatory	Paginate or columnate files for printing	Version 1 AT&T UNIX
printf	Shell programming	Mandatory	Write formatted output	4.3BSD-Reno
prs	SCCS	Optional (XSI)	Print an SCCS file	PWB UNIX
ps	Process management	Mandatory	Report process status	Version 4 AT&T UNIX
pwd	Filesystem	Mandatory	Print working directory	Version 5 AT&T UNIX
read	Shell programming	Mandatory	Read a line from standard input	Version 7 AT&T UNIX
readlink	Filesystem	Mandatory	Print destination of a symbolic link	
realpath	Filesystem	Mandatory	Report the fully qualified path of a file	XPG4
renice	Process management	Mandatory	Set nice values of running processes	4BSD
rm	Filesystem	Mandatory	Remove file(s)	Version 1 AT&T UNIX
rmdel	SCCS	Optional (XSI)	Remove a delta from an SCCS file	PWB UNIX
rmdir	Filesystem	Mandatory	Remove empty directory(ies)	Version 1 AT&T UNIX
sact	SCCS	Optional (XSI)	Print current SCCS file-editing activity	System III
sccs	SCCS	Optional (XSI)	Front end for the SCCS subsystem	4.3BSD
sed	Text processing	Mandatory	Stream editor	Version 7 AT&T UNIX
sh	Shell programming	Mandatory	Shell, the standard command language interpreter	Version 7 AT&T UNIX (in earlier versions, sh was either the Thompson shell or the PWB shell)
sleep	Shell programming	Mandatory	Suspend execution for an interval	Version 4 AT&T UNIX
sort	Text processing	Mandatory	Sort, merge, or sequence check text files	Version 1 AT&T UNIX
split	Misc	Mandatory	Split files into pieces	Version 3 AT&T UNIX
strings	C programming	Mandatory	Find printable strings in files	2BSD
strip	C programming	Optional (SD)	Remove unnecessary information from executable files	Version 1 AT&T UNIX
stty	Misc	Mandatory	Set the options for a terminal	Version 2 AT&T UNIX
tabs	Misc	Mandatory	Set terminal tabs	PWB UNIX
tail	Text processing	Mandatory	Copy the last part of a file	PWB UNIX
talk	Misc	Optional (UP)	Talk to another user	4.2BSD
tee	Shell programming	Mandatory	Duplicate the standard output	Version 5 AT&T UNIX
test	Shell programming	Mandatory	Evaluate expression	Version 7 AT&T UNIX
time	Process management	Mandatory	Display elapsed, system and kernel time used by the current shell or designated process.	Version 3 AT&T UNIX
timeout	Process management	Mandatory	Run command with a time limit	Version 3 AT&T UNIX
touch	Filesystem	Mandatory	Change file access and modification times	Version 7 AT&T UNIX
tput	Misc	Mandatory	Change terminal characteristics	System V
tr	Text processing	Mandatory	Translate characters	Version 4 AT&T UNIX
true	Shell programming	Mandatory	Exit immediately with status 0	Version 7 AT&T UNIX
tsort	Text processing	Mandatory	Topological sort	Version 7 AT&T UNIX
tty	Misc	Mandatory	Report user's terminal name	Version 1 AT&T UNIX
type	Misc	Optional (XSI)	Displays how a name would be interpreted if used as a command	
ulimit	Misc	Optional (XSI)	Set or report file size limit	
umask	Misc	Mandatory	Get or set file mode creation mask	System III
unalias	Misc	Mandatory	Remove alias definitions	
uname	Misc	Mandatory	Report system name	PWB UNIX
uncompress	Misc	Optional (XSI)	Expand compressed data	4.3BSD
unexpand	Text processing	Mandatory	Convert spaces to tabs	3BSD
unget	SCCS	Optional (XSI)	Undo a previous get of an SCCS file	System III
uniq	Text processing	Mandatory	Report or filter out repeated lines in a file	Version 3 AT&T UNIX
unlink	Filesystem	Optional (XSI)	Call the unlink function	Version 1 AT&T UNIX
uucp	Network	Optional (UU)	System-to-system copy	Version 7 AT&T UNIX
uudecode	Network	Mandatory	Decode a binary file	4BSD
uuencode	Network	Mandatory	Encode a binary file	4BSD
uustat	Network	Optional (UU)	uucp status inquiry and job control	System III
uux	Process management	Optional (UU)	Remote command execution	Version 7 AT&T UNIX
val	SCCS	Optional (XSI)	Validate SCCS files	System III
vi	Text processing	Optional (UP)	Screen-oriented (visual) display editor	1BSD
wait	Process management	Mandatory	Await process completion	Version 4 AT&T UNIX
wc	Text processing	Mandatory	Line, word and byte or character count	Version 1 AT&T UNIX
what	SCCS	Optional (XSI)	Identify SCCS files	PWB UNIX
who	System administration	Optional (XSI)	Display who is on the system	Version 1 AT&T UNIX
write	Misc	Mandatory	Write to another user's terminal	Version 1 AT&T UNIX
xargs	Shell programming	Mandatory	Construct argument lists and invoke utility	PWB UNIX
xgettext	C programming	Optional (CD)	Extract gettext calls from C source code strings	IEEE Std 1003.1-2024
yacc	C programming	Optional (CD)	Yet another compiler compiler	PWB UNIX
zcat	Text processing	Optional (XSI)	Expand and concatenate compressed data	4.3BSD

== See also ==
- GNOME Core Applications
- GNU Core Utilities
- List of GNU packages
- List of KDE applications
- List of Unix daemons
- Unix philosophy
- util-linux
