= Type (Unix command) =

Unix command

type
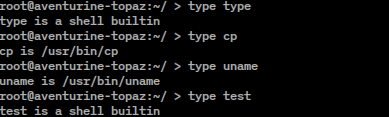
- Examples of type command
- Original author: AT&T Corporation
- Developers: Various open-source and commercial developers
- Release: 1984; 42 years ago
- Operating system: Unix and Unix-like
- Platform: Cross-platform
- Type: Command

In Unix and Unix-like operating systems, type is a command that describes how its arguments would be interpreted if used as command names.

== Function ==
Where applicable, type will display the command name's path. Possible command types are:

- shell built-in
- function
- alias
- hashed command
- keyword

The command returns a non-zero exit status if command names cannot be found.

=== Examples ===
$ type test
test is a shell builtin
$ type cp
cp is /bin/cp
$ type unknown
unknown not found
$ type type
type is a shell builtin

== History ==
The type command was a shell builtin for Bourne shell that was introduced in AT&T's System V Release 2 (SVR2) in 1984, and continues to be included in many other POSIX-compatible shells such as Bash. However, type is not part of the POSIX standard. With a POSIX shell, similar behavior is retrieved with

command -V name

In the KornShell, the command whence provides similar functionality.

The command is available as a separate package for Microsoft Windows as part of the UnxUtils collection of native Win32 ports of common GNU Unix-like utilities.

== See also ==
- List of Unix commands
- which (command)
- hash (Unix)
