= Ipcrm =

ipcrm
- Developers: Various open-source and commercial developers
- Operating system: Unix, Unix-like, IBM i
- Type: Command

ipcrm is a Unix and Linux command which will mark System V interprocess communication API kernel entities for removal. Actual removal is deferred until the last connected process has detached.

System V IPC kernel entities are:

- Shared memory (interprocess communication) segments
- Message queues
- Semaphore arrays

== Implementations ==
On Linux, the ipcrm command is provided by the util-linux package.

The ipcrm command has also been ported to the IBM i operating system.

== See also ==
- List of Unix commands
- ipcs – provide information on ipc facilities
