= Pinguy OS =

Linux distribution

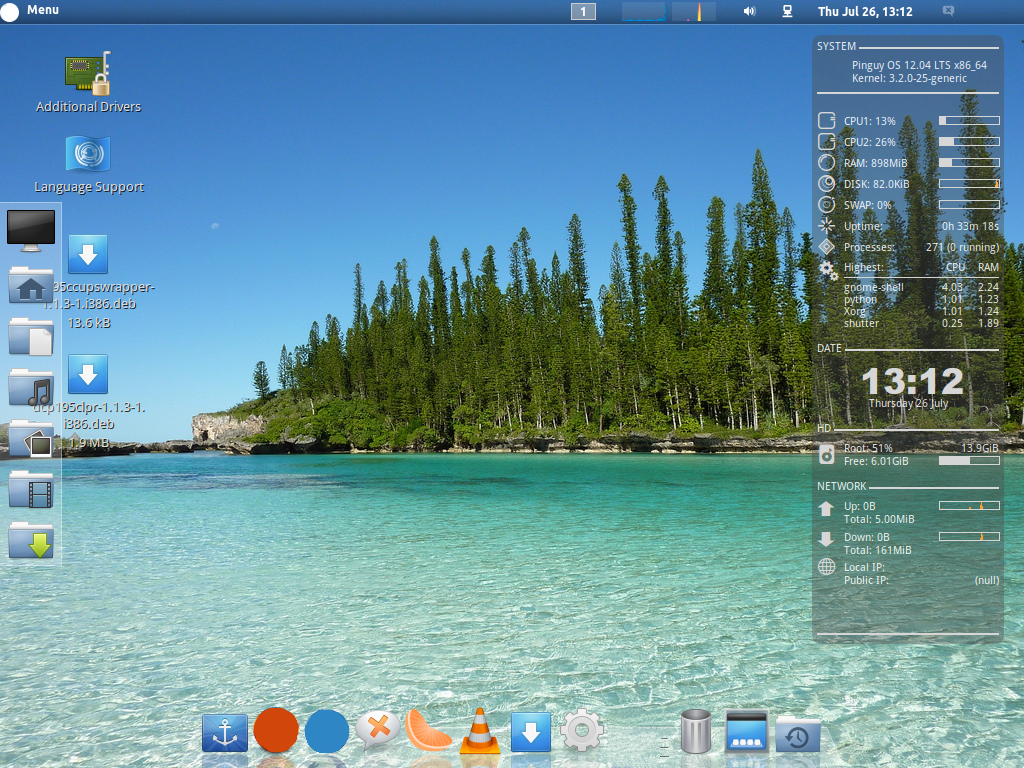
- Pinguy OS 12.04 LTS x86_64
- Developer: Vito Reiter
- OS family: Linux (Unix-like)
- Source model: Open source
- Initial release: 8 April 2010
- Latest release: 18.04.2 / 30 March 2019; 6 years ago
- Latest preview: 18.04 Beta / May 9, 2018; 7 years ago
- Supported platforms: IA-32, x86-64
- Kernel type: Monolithic (Linux)
- Default user interface: GNOME
- Official website: pinguy-os.sourceforge.net

Pinguy OS was a Linux distribution for x86-based personal computers. Pinguy OS is based on Ubuntu, a GNOME-based desktop environment, which was discontinued in 2019 due to it no longer being financially viable. Despite no longer receiving any major version updates, a few of the previous LTS releases are still maintained.

== General info ==
Pinguy OS focused on enhancing Ubuntu's user-friendliness and was tailored towards users unfamiliar with UNIX operating systems. The OS was available in both 32-bit and 64-bit versions. For users that had less available hardware, there was another version made specifically for these older machines to work with less resources.

While it uses a GNOME desktop environment, users had the option of also using a navigation bar on the bottom of the screen, similar to Elementary OS and macOS.

== Release history ==
The following is the release history for Pinguy OS:

Version	Date	Notes
10.04	2011-04-08	LTS Release
10.10	2010-11-12	
10.04.2	2011-02-12	LTS Point Release
10.04.3	2011-05-08	LTS Point Release
11.04.1	2011-05-26	
11.04.1 Mini	2011-06-04	
Ping-Eee OS 11.04.1	2011-07-08	Designed for Netbooks
11.10	2011-11-15	
11.10 Mini	2011-11-25	
12.04	2012-06-17	LTS Release
12.10	2012-11-21	
13.04	2013-05-21	
14.04 Mini	2014-04-28	LTS Release
14.04	2014-05-12	LTS Release
14.04.3	2015-09-11	
14.04.4	2016-03-03	
18.04	2018-07-02	LTS Release.
18.04.1	2018-08-05	
18.04.2	2019-03-30	
