= True and false (commands) =

Shell commands that exit immediately with a 0/1 status

true
- Initial release: January 1979; 47 years ago
- Operating system: Unix and Unix-like
- Platform: Cross-platform
- Type: Command

true and false are shell commands that exit immediately with exit status 0 or 1, respectively. As a script sets its process exit status to the value of the last command it runs, these commands can be used to set the exit status of a script run. All Unix shells interpret an exit status of zero as success and non-zero (usually) as failure, so true sets success and false sets failure. (Note: These are distinct from the truth values of classical logic and most general purpose programming languages: true (1 or T) and false (0 or ⊥). Note that a built-in true sets the exit status, while the program true returns it, with the same effect.)

The commands are available in Unix-like operating systems.

== Use ==
The commands are usually employed in conditional statements and loops of shell scripts. For example, the following script repeatedly executes echo hello until interrupted:

while true
do
  echo hello
done

The commands can be used to ignore the success or failure of a sequence of other commands, as in the example:

make … && false

Setting a user's login shell to false, in /etc/passwd, effectively denies them access to an interactive shell, but their account may still be valid for other services, such as FTP. (Although /sbin/nologin, if available, may be more fitting for this purpose, as it prints a notification before terminating the session.)

The programs accept no command-line arguments except that the GNU version accepts the typical --help and --version options.

== Null command ==
The true command is sometimes substituted with the very similar null command, written as a single colon (:). The null command is built into the shell, and may therefore be more efficient if true is an external program (true is usually a shell built in function). We can rewrite the upper example using : instead of true:

while :
do
  echo hello
done

The null command may take parameters, which are ignored. It is also used as a no-op dummy command for side-effects such as assigning default values to shell variables through the ${parameter:=word} parameter expansion form. For example, from bashbug, the bug-reporting script for Bash:

 : ${TMPDIR:=/tmp}
 : ${EDITOR=$DEFEDITOR}
 : ${USER=${LOGNAME-`whoami`}}

== Null smileys ==
Either true or : can be used as a replacement for cat /dev/null, so there are 3 "null smileys":

:> - create a file or empty it if it already exists;
:>> - create a file if it doesn't exist, unlike touch it does not change the timestamp of existing file;
:| - can be used instead of < /dev/null

Such usage is similar to the IEFBR14's standard usage.

== See also ==
- IEFBR14 – "Do nothing" program on IBM mainframes
- List of POSIX commands
- Two-valued logic – Classical logic of two values, either true or false
