= Wall (Unix) =

Unix command-line messaging utility

wall
- Developer(s): AT&T Bell Laboratories
- Initial release: May 1975; 50 years ago
- Operating system: Unix and Unix-like
- Type: Command

wall (an abbreviation of write to all) is a Unix command-line utility that displays the contents of a computer file or standard input to all logged-in users. It is typically used by root to send out shutting down message to all users just before poweroff.

== Invocation ==
wall reads the message from standard input by default when the filename is omitted. This is done by piping the output of the echo command:

alice@sleipnir:~$ # `tty` to show the current terminal name
alice@sleipnir:~$ tty
/dev/pts/7
alice@sleipnir:~$ echo Remember to brush your teeth! | wall

The message may also be typed in much the same way cat is used: invoking wall by typing wall and pressing ↵ Enter followed by a message, pressing ↵ Enter and Ctrl+D:

alice@sleipnir:~$ wall
Remember to brush your teeth!
^D

Using a here-string:

alice@sleipnir:~$ wall <<< 'Remember to brush your teeth!'

Reading from a file is also supported:

alice@sleipnir:~$ cat .important_announcement
Remember to brush your teeth!
alice@sleipnir:~$ wall .important_announcement # same as `wall !$`

All the commands above should display the following output on terminals that users allow write access to (see mesg(1)):

Broadcast Message from alice@sleipnir
  (/dev/pts/7) at 16:15 ...

Remember to brush your teeth!

== See also ==
- Jordan Hubbard § rwall incident
