= Tty (Unix) =

Command to print the file name of the terminal connected to standard input

tty
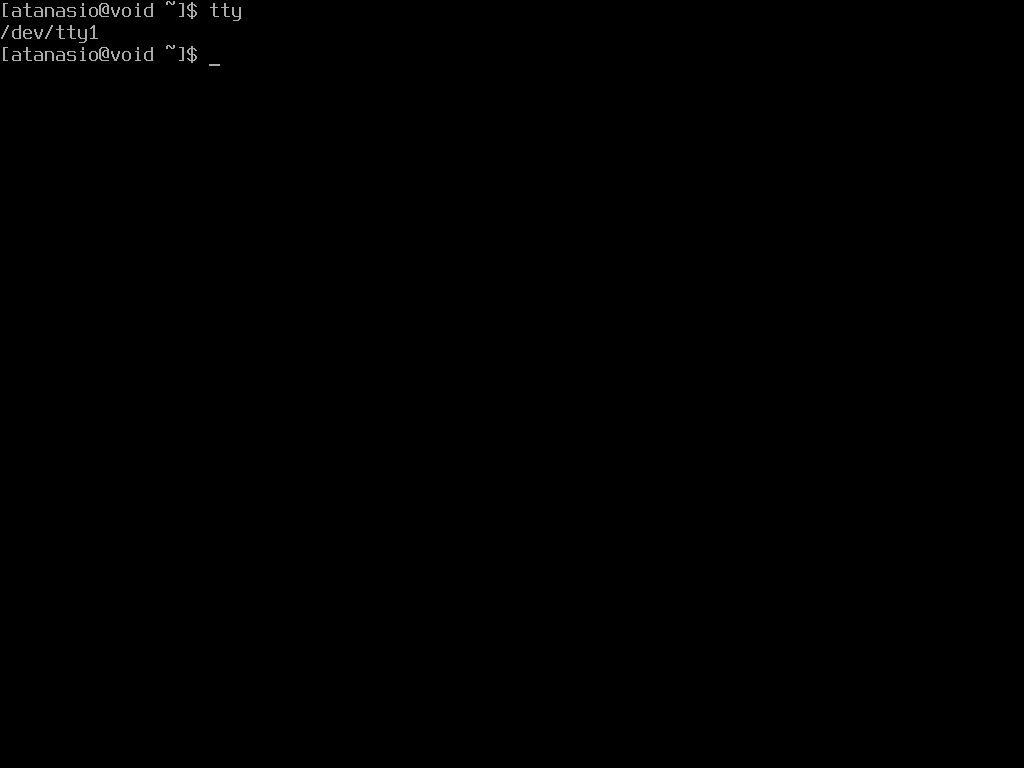
- tty command on a Void Linux machine
- Initial release: November 3, 1971; 54 years ago
- Operating system: Unix and Unix-like
- Platform: Cross-platform
- Type: Command

In computing, tty is a command in Unix and Unix-like operating systems to print the file name of the terminal connected to standard input.

tty stands for "teletypewriter".

== Usage ==
The tty command is commonly used to check if the output medium is a terminal. The command prints the file name of the terminal connected to standard input. If no file is detected (in case, it's being run as part of a script or the command is being piped) "not a tty" is printed to standard output and the command exits with an exit status of 1. The command also can be run in silent mode (tty -s) where no output is produced, and the command exits with an appropriate exit status.

== See also ==
- Pseudoterminal
- Teleprinter
