= Hash (Unix) =

Standard UNIX utility

hash
- Developers: Various open-source and commercial developers
- Operating system: Unix, Unix-like, IBM i
- Type: Command

hash is a command on Unix and Unix-like operating systems that prints the location information for the commands found. The hash command has also been ported to the IBM i operating system.

== Syntax ==
$ hash [name]

== Description ==
When the user gives a command, the shell searches for the command in a list of locations specified by the PATH environmental variable. To avoid this work in future, when a command is found its location is stored in a hash table which is consulted before the search. The hash command is used to display or manipulate that hash table, particularly to replace obsolete entries in the rare but possible case that a command is added to the PATH. The hash command is built into the shell. The C shell implements this command in a different way.

== Options ==
The following options are supported.

name
Searches the PATH environmental variable for the name given

== Exit Status ==
This command returns the following exit values:

0
Successful completion

1
An Error occurred

== Examples ==
$ hash

Print the hash table.

$ hash cat

Searches for command cat in the path specified by PATH environmental variable; if found, adds it to the hash.

== See also ==
- find
- Unix shell
  - sh
  - bash
  - csh
  - ksh
