= Chmod =

Shell command for changing access permissions of a file

chmod
- Original author: AT&T Bell Laboratories
- Developers: Various open-source and commercial developers
- Release: 3 November 1971; 55 years ago
- Written in: Plan 9: C
- Operating system: Unix, Unix-like, Plan 9, Inferno, IBM i
- Platform: Cross-platform
- Type: Command
- License: coreutils: GPLv3; Plan 9: MIT License

chmod is a shell command for changing access permissions and special mode flags of files (including special files such as directories). The name is short for change mode where mode refers to the permissions and flags collectively.

The command originated in AT&T Unix version 1 and was exclusive to Unix and Unix-like operating systems until it was ported to other operating systems such as Windows (in UnxUtils) and IBM i.

In Unix and Unix-like operating systems, a system call with the same name as the command, chmod(), provides access to the underlying access control data. The command exposes the capabilities of the system call to a shell user.

As the need for enhanced file-system permissions grew, access-control lists were added to many file systems to augment the modes controlled via chmod.

The implementation of chmod bundled in GNU coreutils was written by David MacKenzie and Jim Meyering.

== Use ==
Although the syntax of the command varies somewhat by implementation, it generally accepts either a single octal value (which specifies all the mode bits on each file), or a comma-delimited list of symbolic specifiers (which describes how to change the existing mode bits of each file). The remaining arguments are a list of paths to files to be modified.

Changing permissions is only allowed for the superuser (root) and the owner of a file.

If a symbolic link is specified, the target of the link has its mode bits adjusted. Permissions directly associated with a symbolic link file system entry are typically not used.

=== Options ===
Optional, command-line options may include:

- -R recursive; include contained files and subdirectories of specified directories
- -v verbose; log changed file names

=== Octal notation ===
Given a numeric permissions argument, the chmod command treats it as an octal number, (Note: Why octal rather than decimal? Although rarely used today, during the early development of UNIX, octal was very useful because repeating groups of 3 bits were common in the physical structure of computers at the time, and these bits were easier to read and understand when encoded as octal digits, just as groups of 4 bits are easier when grouped into hexadecimal digits. The numeric expression of filesystem permissions in octal is one of the few remnants of this time.) and replaces all the mode bits for each file. (Although four digits are specified, leading 0 digits can be elided.)

There are twelve standard mode bits, comprising three special bits (setuid, setgid, and sticky), and three permission groups (controlling access by user, group, and other) of 3 bits each (read, write, and exec/scan); each permission bit grants access if set (1) or denies access if clear (0).

As an octal digit represents a 3-bit value, the twelve mode bits can be represented as four octal digits. chmod accepts up to four digits and uses 0 for left digits not specified (as is normal for numeric representation). In practice, three digits are commonly specified since the special modes are rarely used and the user class is usually specified.

In the context of an octal digit, each operation bit represents a numeric value: read: 4, write: 2 and execute: 1. The following table relates octal digit values to a class operations value.

Octal digit permission
#	bits	rwx	granted operations
7	4 + 2 + 1	rwx	read, write and execute
6	4 + 2	rw-	read and write
5	4 + 1	r-x	read and execute
4	4	r--	read-only
3	2 + 1	-wx	write and execute
2	2	-w-	write-only
1	1	--x	execute-only
0		---	none

The command stat can report a file's permissions as octal. For example:

$ stat -c %a findPhoneNumbers.sh
754

The reported value, 754 indicates the following permissions:

- user class: read, write, and execute; 7 => (4 + 2 + 1)
- group class: read and execute; 5 => (4 + 1)
- others class: read-only; (4)

A code permits execution if and only if it is odd (i.e. 1, 3, 5, or 7). A code permits read if and only if it is greater than or equal to 4 (i.e. 4, 5, 6, or 7). A code permits write if and only if it is 2, 3, 6, or 7.

=== Symbolic notation ===
The chmod command accepts symbolic notation that specifies how to modify the existing permissions. The command accepts a comma-separate list of specifiers like: [classes]+|-|=operations

Classes map permissions to users. A change specifier can select one class by including its symbol, multiple by including each class's symbol with no delimiter, or all classes by not specifying a symbol; when using the last method, the bits of the umask mask will remain unchanged. Class specifiers include:

Class specifiers
symbol	description
u	user: file owner
g	group: members of the file's group
o	others: users who are neither the file's owner nor members of the file's group
a	all three classes; same as ugo

As ownership is key to access control, and since the symbolic specification uses the abbreviation o, some incorrectly think that it means owner, when, in fact, it is short for others.

The change operators include:

Operators
symbol	description
+	add operations/flags
-	remove operations/flags
=	set the entire operations/flags field; grants the specified operations and denies others

Operations can be specified as follows:

Operation specifiers
symbol	description
r	read a regular file or list a directory's contents
w	write to a file
x	execute a regular file or recurse a directory tree
X	special execute: selects to apply execute to directories (regardless of their current permissions) and apply execute to files that already have at least one execute permission granted (for any class); only useful with operation + and usually in combination with option -R for giving group or others access to a directory tree without setting execute permission on regular files, which would normally happen with chmod -R a+rx .; instead use chmod -R a+rX .
s	setuid mode or setgid mode
t	sticky mode

Most chmod implementations support the specification of the special modes in octal, but some do not which requires using the symbolic notation.

The ls command can report file permissions in a symbolic notation that is similar to the notation used with chmod. ls -l reports permissions in a notation that consists of 10 letters. The first indicates the type of the file system entry, such as dash for regular file and 'd' for directory. Following that are three sets of three letters that indicate read, write and execute permissions grouped by user, group and others classes. Each position is either dash to indicate lack of permission or the single-letter abbreviation for the permission to indicate that it's granted. For example:

$ ls -l findPhoneNumbers.sh
-rwxr-xr--  1 dgerman  staff  823 Dec 16 15:03 findPhoneNumbers.sh

The permission specifier -rwxr-xr-- starts with a dash, which indicates that findPhoneNumbers.sh is a regular file, not a directory. The next three letters rwx indicate that the file can be read, written, and executed by the owning user dgerman. The next three letters r-x indicate that the file can be read and executed by members of the staff group. And the last three letters r-- indicate that the file is read-only for other users.

== Examples ==
Add write permission to the group class of a directory, allowing users in the same group to add files:

$ ls -ld dir # before
drwxr-xr-x   2 jsmitt  northregion 96 Apr 8 12:53 shared_dir
$ chmod g+w dir
$ ls -ld dir  # after
drwxrwxr-x   2 jsmitt  northregion 96 Apr 8 12:53 shared_dir

Remove write permission for all classes, preventing anyone from writing to the file:

$ ls -l ourBestReferenceFile
-rw-rw-r--   2 tmiller  northregion 96 Apr 8 12:53 ourBestReferenceFile
$ chmod a-w ourBestReferenceFile
$ ls -l ourBestReferenceFile
-r--r--r--   2 tmiller  northregion 96 Apr 8 12:53 ourBestReferenceFile

Set the permissions for the user and group classes to read- and execute-only, with no write permission, preventing anyone from adding files:

$ ls -ld referenceLib
drwxr-----   2 ebowman  northregion 96 Apr 8 12:53 referenceLib
$ chmod ug=rx referenceLib
$ ls -ld referenceLib
dr-xr-x---   2 ebowman  northregion 96 Apr 8 12:53 referenceLib

Enable read and write for the user class while making it read-only for group and others:

$ chmod u=rw,go=r sample
$ ls -ld sample
drw-r--r--   2 oschultz  warehousing       96 Dec  8 12:53 sample

To recursively set access for the directory docs/ and its contained files	chmod -R u+w docs/
To set user and group for read- and write-only and set others for read-only	chmod 664 file
To set user for read-, write-, and execute-only and group and others for read-only	chmod 744 file
To set the sticky bit in addition to user, group and others permissions	chmod 1755 file
To set UID in addition to user, group and others permissions	chmod 4755 file
To set GID in addition to user, group and others permissions	chmod 2755 file

== See also ==
- attrib
- cacls, modifies access control lists
- chattr, changes the attributes of a file
- chgrp, changes the group of a file
- chown, changes the owner of a file
- Group identifier – Unix/POSIX system account group number; numeric value used to represent a specific group
- List of POSIX commands
- User identifier – Value identifying a user account in Unix and Unix-like operating systems
- umask, restricts permissions at file creation
