= Fstab =

System configuration file for disk partitions

fstab (after file systems table) is a system file commonly found in the directory /etc on Unix and Unix-like computer systems. The /etc/fstab file is used by utilities from the util-linux package (such as mount and findmnt), but it's not limited to them — it is also processed by systemd via systemd-fstab-generator for automatic mounting during boot. The fstab file typically lists all available disk partitions and other types of file systems and data sources that may not necessarily be disk-based, and indicates how they are to be initialized or otherwise integrated into the larger file system structure.

The fstab file is read by the mount command, which happens automatically at boot time to determine the overall file system structure, and thereafter when a user executes the mount command to modify that structure. It is the duty of the system administrator to properly create and maintain the fstab file.

While fstab is used for basic system configuration, for other uses, it has been superseded by automatic mounting mechanisms.

The file has other names on some versions of Unix; for example, it is found at /etc/vfstab on Solaris systems.

== Modern use ==
The fstab file is read by programs that work with disk partitions and other file systems and is not automatically maintained. Instead it is written by the system administrator or sometimes by an operating system installation program. However, some administration tools can automatically build and edit fstab, or act as graphical editors for it.

Modern Linux systems use udev as an automounter to handle the hot swapping of devices (such as MP3 players or digital cameras) instead of relying on fstab. Programs such as pmount allow ordinary users to mount and unmount filesystems without a corresponding fstab entry; traditional Unix has always allowed privileged users (the root user and users in the wheel group) to mount or unmount devices without a corresponding fstab entry.

== Example ==
The following is an example of an fstab file on a typical Linux system.

# device-spec     mount-point     fs-type      options                                          dump pass
LABEL=/           /               ext4         defaults                                            1 1
UUID=7890abcd-x   none            swap         defaults                                            0 0
none              /dev/pts        devpts       gid=5,mode=620                                      0 0
none              /proc           proc         defaults                                            0 0
none              /dev/shm        tmpfs        defaults                                            0 0

# Removable media
/dev/cdrom        /mnt/cdrom      udf,iso9660  noauto,owner,ro                                     0 0

# NTFS Windows 11 partition
/dev/nvme0n1p7    /mnt/Windows    ntfs         quiet,defaults,locale=en_US.utf8,umask=0,noexec     0 0

# Partition shared by Windows and Linux
/dev/nvme0n1p8    /mnt/shared     vfat         umask=000                                           0 0

# Mounting tmpfs
tmpfs             /mnt/tmpfschk   tmpfs        size=100m                                           0 0

# Mounting cifs
//cifs_name/store /store/pingu    cifs         credentials=/root/smbpass.txt                       0 0

# Mounting NFS
nfs_name:/store   /store          nfs          rw                                                  0 0

The order of records in fstab is important because fsck(8), mount(8), and umount(8) sequentially iterate through fstab and mount in the order defined.

Blank lines and comment lines beginning with a "#" are ignored.

The space or tab-separated fields within each row must appear in a specific order:

1. device-spec – The device name, label, UUID, or other means of specifying the partition or data source this entry refers to.
2. mount-point – Where the contents of the device may be accessed after mounting; for swap partitions or files, this is set to none.
3. fs-type – The type of file system to be mounted.
4. options – Options describing various other aspects of the file system, such as whether it is automatically mounted at boot, which users may mount or access it, whether it may be written to or only read from, its size, and so forth; the special option defaults refers to a pre-determined set of options depending on the file system type.
5. dump – A number indicating whether and how often the file system should be backed up by the dump program; a zero indicates the file system will never be automatically backed up.
6. pass – A number indicating the order in which the fsck program will check the devices for errors at boot time:

- 0 - do not check
- 1 - check immediately during boot
- 2 - check after boot

Missing values in the last two fields are interpreted as zeros. If necessary, space characters in the first, second, and fourth fields are indicated by U+0040 @ COMMERCIAL AT.

== Options common to all filesystems ==
auto / noauto
With the auto option, the device will be mounted automatically at bootup or when the mount -a command is issued. auto is the default option. For the device not to be mounted automatically, the noauto option is used in /etc/fstab. With noauto, the device can be only mounted explicitly.
dev / nodev
Controls behavior of the interpretation of block special devices on the filesystem.
exec / noexec
exec lets binaries that are on the partition be executed, whereas noexec is the opposite. noexec might be useful for a partition that contains no binaries, like /var, or contains binaries the user may not want to execute on the system, or that cannot even be executed on the system, as might be the case of a Windows partition.
rw / ro
Mount the filesystem in either read write or read only mode. Explicitly defining a file system as rw can alleviate some problems in file systems that default to read only, as can be the case with floppies or NTFS partitions.
sync / async
How the input and output to the filesystem should be done. sync means it is done synchronously. Looking at the example fstab, this is the option used with the floppy. This means that when, for example, a file is copied to the floppy, the changes are physically written to the floppy at the same time copy command is issued.
suid / nosuid
Controls the behavior of the operation of suid, and sgid bits.
user / users / nouser
user permits any user to mount the filesystem. This automatically implies noexec, nosuid, nodev unless explicitly overridden. If nouser is specified, only root can mount the filesystem. If users is specified, every user in group users will be able to unmount the volume.
defaults
Use default settings. Default settings are defined per file system at the file system level. For ext3 file systems these can be set with the tune2fs command. The normal default for ext3 file systems is equivalent to rw,suid,dev,exec,auto,nouser,async. Modern Red Hat based systems set ACL support as default on the root file system but not on user-created ext3 filesystems. Some file systems such as XFS enable ACLs by default. Default file system mount attributes can be overridden in /etc/fstab.
owner (Linux-specific)
Permit the owner of device to mount.
nofail
Do not stop system boot if disk mount failed.
atime / noatime / relatime / strictatime / lazytime (Linux-specific)
The Unix stat structure records when files are last accessed (atime), modified (mtime), and changed (ctime). One result is that atime is written every time a file is read, which has been heavily criticized for causing performance degradation and increased wear. However, atime is used by some applications and desired by some users, and thus is configurable as atime (update on access), noatime (do not update), or (in Linux) relatime (update atime if older than mtime). Through Linux 2.6.29, atime was the default; as of 2.6.30, relatime is the default.

== Filesystem-specific options ==
There are many options for the specific filesystems supported by mount. Listed below are some of the more commonly used. The full list may be found in the documentation for mount. Note that these are for Linux; traditional Unix-like systems have generally provided similar functionality but with slightly different syntax or forms.

=== ext2 ===
check=[none, normal, strict]
Sets the fsck checking level.
debug
Print debugging info on each remount.
sb=n
n is the block which should be used as the super-block for the filesystem.

=== FAT-only ===
check=[r(elaxed), n(ormal), s(trict)]
Policy for allowed filenames. See mount(8).
conv=[b(inary), t(ext), a(uto)]
Performs DOS <=> UNIX text file conversions automatically. See mount(8).

=== FAT, NTFS ===
windows_names
Linux filesystems have a larger set of allowed characters in filenames. windows_names restricts the set of allowed characters for the volume to only those acceptable by Windows; though FAT/NTFS are the most common use cases, this feature is not specifically restricted to those filesystem types.
uid=n, gid=n
Sets the user identifier (uid), and group identifier (gid) for all files on the filesystem.
umask=nnn, dmask=nnn, fmask=nnn
Controls masking of filesystem nodes.

- umask - user file creation
- dmask - directory creation
- fmask - for files only

More detailed information about the fstab file can be found in the man page for Linux fstab; for other systems see below.

=== NFS ===
addr=ip
ip is a valid IP address.

== See also ==
- mount (computing)
- mount (Unix)
- mtab
