= Suid =

Suid or SUID may refer to:

- Suidae, animals such as pigs
- SUID, sudden and unexpected infant death

In computing:

- setuid, a privilege elevation mechanism
- Saved user ID, a type of user identifier for processes
