= Edit mask =

Edit mask may refer to:

- Bit mask
- Filter criteria called edit mask (for example, erasing of leading zeros and non-numerical symbols) for various computerized input fields
- The user mask associated with each process in Unix and Linux systems, which restricts the permissions that can be set on newly created files
