= Chattr =

Command in Linux

chattr
- Original author: Remy Card
- Operating system: Linux
- Platform: Cross-platform
- Type: Command

chflags
- Operating system: BSD-like systems, including macOS
- Platform: Cross-platform
- Type: Command

chattr is the command in Linux that allows a user to set certain attributes of a file. lsattr is the command that displays the attributes of a file.

Most BSD-like systems, including macOS, have always had an analogous chflags command to set the attributes, but no command specifically meant to display them; specific options to the ls command are used instead. The chflags command first appeared in 4.4BSD.

Solaris has no commands specifically meant to manipulate them. chmod and ls are used instead.

Other Unix-like operating systems, in general, have no analogous commands. The similar-sounding commands chatr (from HP-UX) and lsattr (from AIX) exist but have unrelated functions.

Among other things, the chattr command is useful to make files immutable so that password files and certain system files cannot be erased during software upgrades.

== In Linux systems (chattr and lsattr) ==
=== File system support ===
The command line tools chattr (to manipulate attributes) and lsattr (to list attributes) were originally specific to the Second Extended Filesystem family (ext2, ext3, ext4), and are available as part of the e2fsprogs package.

However, the functionality has since been extended, fully or partially, to many other systems, including XFS, ReiserFS, JFS and OCFS2. The btrfs file system includes the attribute functionality, including the C flag, which turns off the built-in copy-on-write (CoW) feature of btrfs due to slower performance associated with CoW.

=== chattr description ===
The form of the chattr command is:

 chattr [-RVf] [-+=AacDdijsTtSu] [-v version] files...

- -R recursively changes attributes of directories and their contents
- -V is to be verbose and print the program version
- -f suppresses most error messages

=== lsattr description ===
The form of the lsattr command (gnu 1.41.3):

 lsattr [ -RVadv ] [ files...  ]

- -R recursively lists attributes of directories and their contents
- -V displays the program version
- -a lists all files in directories, including dotfiles
- -d lists directories like other files, rather than listing their contents

=== Attributes ===
Some attributes include:

File attributes on a Linux file system according to the chattr(1) Linux man page
Attribute	lsattr flag	chattr option	Semantics and rationale
No atime updates	A	+A to set -A to clear	When a file with the A attribute set is accessed, its atime record is not modified.; This avoids a certain amount of disk I/O operations.
Append only	a	+a to set -a to clear (Note: Only the superuser or a process possessing the CAP_LINUX_IMMUTABLE capability can set or clear these attributes.)	A file with the a attribute set can only be open in append mode for writing.
Compressed	c	+c to set -c to clear (Note: These attributes are not honored by the ext2 and ext3 filesystems as implemented in the current mainline Linux kernels.)	A file with the c attribute set is automatically compressed on the disk by the kernel.; A read from this file returns uncompressed data.; A write to this file compresses data before storing them on the disk.
No Copy-on-Write (CoW)	C	+C to set -C to clear (Note: These attributes only make sense for Copy-on-Write file-systems such as btrfs.)	A file with the C attribute will not be subject to Copy-on-Write updates.; Updates to these files may not be subject to atomic snapshots, and may lack some reliability information on some filesystems and kernels.
Synchronous directory updates	D	+D to set -D to clear	When a directory with the D attribute set is modified, the changes are written synchronously on the disk; This is equivalent to the dirsync mount option, applied to a subset of the files.
No dump	d	+d to set -d to clear	A file with the d attribute set is not candidate for backup when the dump program is run.
Compression error	E	(unavailable)	The E attribute is used by the experimental compression patches to indicate that a compressed file has a compression error.
Extent format	e	(unavailable)	The e attribute indicates that the file is using extents for mapping the blocks on disk.
Huge file	h	(unavailable)	The h attribute indicates the file is storing its blocks in units of the filesystem blocksize instead of in units of sectors.; It means that the file is, or at one time was, larger than 2TB.
Indexed directory	I	(unavailable)	The I attribute is used by the htree program code to indicate that a directory is being indexed using hashed trees.
Immutable	i	+i to set -i to clear	A file with the i attribute cannot be modified.; It cannot be deleted or renamed, no link can be created to this file and no data can be written to the file.; When set, prevents, even the superuser, from erasing or changing the contents of the file.
Data journaling	j	+j to set -j to clear (Note: Only the superuser or a process possessing the CAP_SYS_RESOURCE capability can set or clear this attribute.)	A file with the j attribute has all of its data written to the ext3 journal before being written to the file itself, if the filesystem is mounted with the "data=ordered" or "data=writeback" options.; When the filesystem is mounted with the "data=journal" option all file data is already journaled, so this attribute has no effect.
Secure deletion	s	+s to set -s to clear (Note: This attribute is not honored by the ext4 filesystem as implemented in the current mainline Linux kernels as reported in Bug #17872.)	When a file with the s attribute set is deleted, its blocks are zeroed and written back to the disk.
Synchronous updates	S	+S to set -S to clear	When a file with the S attribute set is modified, the changes are written synchronously on the disk; this is equivalent to the 'sync' mount option applied to a subset of the files.; This is equivalent to the sync mount option, applied to a subset of the files.
Top of directory hierarchy	T	+T to set -T to clear	A directory with the T attribute will be deemed to be the top of directory hierarchies for the purposes of the Orlov block allocator.; This is a hint to the block allocator used by ext3 and ext4 that the subdirectories under this directory are not related, and thus should be spread apart for allocation purposes.; For example: it is a very good idea to set the T attribute on the /home directory, so that /home/john and /home/mary are placed into separate block groups.; For directories where this attribute is not set, the Orlov block allocator will try to group subdirectories closer together where possible.
No tail-merging	t	+t to set -t to clear	For those filesystems that support tail-merging, a file with the t attribute will not have a partial block fragment at the end of the file merged with other files.; This is necessary for applications such as LILO, which reads the filesystem directly and doesn't understand tail-merged files.
Undeletable	u	+u to set -u to clear	When a file with the u attribute set is deleted, its contents are saved.; This allows the user to ask for its undeletion.
Compression raw access	X	(unavailable)	The X attribute is used by the experimental compression patches to indicate that a raw contents of a compressed file can be accessed directly.
Compressed dirty file	Z	(unavailable)	The Z attribute is used by the experimental compression patches to indicate a compressed file is "dirty".
Version / generation number	-v	-v version	File's version/generation number.

== In BSD-like systems (chflags) ==
=== File system support ===
The chflags command is not specific to particular file systems. UFS on BSD systems, and APFS, HFS+, SMB, AFP, and FAT on macOS support at least some flags.

=== chflags description ===
The form of the chflags command is:

 chflags [-R [-H | -L | -P]] flags file ...

- -H If the -R option is specified, symbolic links on the command line are followed. (Symbolic links encountered in the tree traversal are not followed.)
- -L If the -R option is specified, all symbolic links are followed.
- -P If the -R option is specified, no symbolic links are followed. This is the default.
- -R Change the file flags for the file hierarchies rooted in the files instead of just the files themselves.

=== Displaying ===
BSD-like systems, in general, have no default user-level command specifically meant to display the flags of a file. The ls command will do with either the -lo, or the -lO, depending on the system, flags passed.

=== Attributes ===
All traditional attributes can be set or cleared by the super-user; some can also be set or cleared by the owner of the file. Some attributes include:

File attributes
Attribute	ls flag	chflags flag	Owner-settable	OS support	Semantics and rationale
Archived	arch	arch, archived	No	All	File is archived
Opaque	opaque	opaque	Yes	All	Directory is opaque when viewed through a union mount
No dump	nodump	nodump	Yes	All	File cannot be dumped
System append-only	sappnd	sappnd, sappend	No	All	Existing data in the file can't be overwritten and the file cannot be truncated
User append-only	uappnd	uappnd, uappend	Yes	All	Existing data in the file can't be overwritten and the file cannot be truncated
System immutable	schg	schg, schange, simmutable	No	All	File cannot be changed, renamed, moved, or removed
User immutable	uchg	uchg, uchange, uimmutable	Yes	All	File cannot be changed, renamed, moved, or removed
System no-unlink	sunlnk	sunlnk, sunlink	No	FreeBSD, DragonFly BSD, macOS	File cannot be removed, renamed or mounted on; on macOS this flag needs to be set or cleared from single user mode
User no-unlink	uunlnk	uunlnk, uunlink	Yes	FreeBSD, DragonFly BSD	File cannot be removed, renamed or mounted on
Hidden	hidden	hidden	Yes	macOS	File is hidden by default in the GUI (but not in ls)
Hidden	hidden	hidden, uhidden	Yes	FreeBSD	File might be hidden by default in some GUI desktops (but not in ls)
Tracked	tracked	tracked	Yes	macOS	File modifications and deletions are tracked
Restricted	restricted	restricted	No	macOS	File is protected by System Integrity Protection; accompanied by the extended attribute com.apple.rootless; flag needs to be set or cleared from Recovery Mode
Compressed	compressed		No	macOS	File is HFS-compressed (read-only flag); not available on APFS-formatted volumes
Data Vault			No	macOS	Hidden privacy flag since macOS Mojave set by the core system to prohibit any access without special entitlements
Offline	offline	offline, uoffline	Yes	FreeBSD	File is offline
Snapshot	snapshot		No	FreeBSD, NetBSD	File is a snapshot file (read-only flag)
Sparse	sparse	sparse, usparse	Yes	FreeBSD	Writes of all zeroes may be written as "holes"
Must be archived	uarch	uarch, uarchive	Yes	FreeBSD	File must be archived

== See also ==
- ATTRIB – analogous command in MS-DOS, OS/2 and Microsoft Windows
- chown – change file/directory ownership in a Unix system
- chmod – change file access control attributes in a Unix system
- cacls – change file access control lists in Microsoft Windows NT
