= File types =

For information on computer file types, see:

- File format

For information relating to specific operating systems, see also:

- Apple file types
  - Macintosh OSTypes
  - Uniform type identifier
- Unix file types
- Windows file types

For a list of filename extensions, see

- list of file formats
- list of filename extensions (alphabetical)

For information on related concepts, see also:

- file system
- extended attributes
