= Lsattr =

lsattr may refer to:

- the lsattr command from the Linux operating system, displaying counterpart of the chattr command
- lsattr (AIX command), command from the AIX operating system, intended to display attributes of devices
