= System Integrity Protection =

Security feature by Apple

- Security layers present in macOS
- Developer: Apple Inc.
- Release: September 16, 2015; 11 years ago
- Operating system: macOS
- Included with: OS X El Capitan (OS X 10.11) and later
- Type: Computer security software
- Website: developer.apple.com/library/archive/documentation/Security/Conceptual/System_Integrity_Protection_Guide/Introduction/Introduction.html

System Integrity Protection (SIP, sometimes referred to as rootless) is a security feature of Apple's macOS operating system introduced in OS X El Capitan (2015) (OS X 10.11). It comprises a number of mechanisms that are enforced by the kernel. A centerpiece of SIP is the protection of system-owned files and directories against modifications by processes without a specific "entitlement", even when executed by the root user or a user with root privileges (sudo).

Apple says that the root user can be a significant risk to the system's security, especially on a system with a single user account on which that user is also the administrator. SIP is enabled by default but can be disabled.

== Justification ==
Apple says that SIP is a necessary step to ensure a high level of security. In one of the WWDC developer sessions, Apple engineer Pierre-Olivier Martel described unrestricted root access as one of the remaining weaknesses of the system, saying that "[any] piece of malware is one password or vulnerability away from taking full control of the device". He stated that most installations of macOS have only one user account that necessarily carries administrative credentials with it, which means that most users can grant root access to any program that asks for it. Whenever a user on such a system is prompted and enters their account password – which Martel says is often weak or non-existent – the security of the entire system is potentially compromised. Restricting the power of root is not unprecedented on macOS. For instance, versions of macOS prior to Mac OS X Leopard enforce level 1 of securelevel, a security feature that originates in BSD and its derivatives upon which macOS is partially based.

== Functions ==
The "prohibitory symbol" is shown when macOS is not allowed to complete the boot process. This can happen when "kext signing" is enabled and the user installed an unsigned kernel extension.

SIP comprises the following mechanisms:

- Protection of contents and file-system permissions of system files and directories;
- Protection of processes against code injection, runtime attachment (like debugging) and DTrace;
- Protection against unsigned kernel extensions ("kexts").

SIP protects system files and directories that are flagged for protection. This happens either by adding an extended file attribute to a file or directory, by adding the file or directory to /System/Library/Sandbox/rootless.conf or both. Among the protected directories are: /System, /bin, /sbin, /usr (but not /usr/local). The symbolic links from /etc, /tmp and /var to /private/etc, /private/tmp and /private/var are also protected, although the target directories are not themselves protected. Most preinstalled Apple applications in /Applications are protected as well. The kernel, XNU, prevents processes without specific entitlements from modifying the permissions and contents of flagged files and directories and also prevents code injection, runtime attachment and DTrace with respect to protected executables.

Since OS X Yosemite, kernel extensions, such as drivers, have to be code-signed with a particular Apple entitlement. Developers have to request a developer ID with such an entitlement from Apple. The kernel refuses to boot if unsigned extensions are present, showing the user a prohibition sign instead. This mechanism, called "kext signing", was integrated into SIP.

SIP will also sanitize certain environmental variables when calling system programs when SIP is in effect. For example, SIP will sanitize LD_LIBRARY_PATH and DYLD_LIBRARY_PATH before calling a system program like /bin/bash to avoid code injections into the Bash process.

== Configuration ==
The directories protected by SIP by default include:

- /System
- /sbin
- /bin
- /usr
- /Applications

/usr is protected with the exception of /usr/local subdirectory. /Applications is protected for apps that are pre-installed with macOS, such as Calendar, Photos, Safari, Terminal, Console, App Store, and Notes.

SIP can only be disabled (either wholly or partly) from outside of the system partition. To that end, Apple provides the csrutil command-line utility which can be executed from a Terminal window within the recovery system or a bootable macOS installation disk, which adds a boot argument to the device's NVRAM. This applies the setting to all of the installations of El Capitan or newer on the device. Upon installation of macOS, the installer moves any unknown components within flagged system directories to /Library/SystemMigration/History/Migration-[UUID]/QuarantineRoot/. By preventing write access to system directories, the system file and directory permissions are maintained automatically during Apple software updates. As a result, permissions repair is not available in Disk Utility and the corresponding diskutil operation.

== Reception ==
Reception of SIP has been mixed. Macworld expressed the concern that Apple could take full control away from users and developers in future releases and move the security policy of macOS slowly toward that of Apple's mobile operating system iOS, whereupon the installation of many utilities and modifications requires jailbreaking. Some applications and drivers will not work to their full extent or cannot be operated at all unless the feature is disabled, either temporarily or permanently. Ars Technica suggested that this could affect smaller developers disproportionately, as larger ones may be able to work with Apple directly. However, they also remarked that by far most users, including power users, will not have a reason to turn the feature off, saying that there are "almost no downsides" to it.

== See also ==
- AppArmor
- Computer security
- Security-Enhanced Linux (SELinux)
- Social engineering (security)
- Trusted Computing
- Trusted Solaris
- User Account Control
- User Interface Privilege Isolation
- Windows File Protection
