= Mtab =

The mtab (mounted file systems table) file is a system information file, commonly found on Unix-like systems.

== Overview ==
This file lists all currently mounted filesystems along with their initialization options. mtab has a lot in common with fstab, the distinction being that the latter is a configuration file listing which available filesystems should be mounted on which mount points at boot time, whereas the former lists currently mounted ones, which can include manually mounted ones not listed in fstab. Therefore, mtab is usually in a format similar to that of fstab. Most of the time it is possible to directly use lines from mtab in fstab.

The file commonly resides in /etc/mtab. In some systems it is a symlink to /proc/mounts.

== Example ==
Sample mtab contents:

/dev/sdb1 / ext3 rw,relatime,errors=remount-ro 0 0
proc /proc proc rw,noexec,nosuid,nodev 0 0
/sys /sys sysfs rw,noexec,nosuid,nodev 0 0
varrun /var/run tmpfs rw,noexec,nosuid,nodev,mode=0755 0 0
varlock /var/lock tmpfs rw,noexec,nosuid,nodev,mode=1777 0 0
udev /dev tmpfs rw,mode=0755 0 0
devshm /dev/shm tmpfs rw 0 0
devpts /dev/pts devpts rw,gid=5,mode=620 0 0
lrm /lib/modules/2.6.24-16-generic/volatile tmpfs rw 0 0
securityfs /sys/kernel/security securityfs rw 0 0
gvfs-fuse-daemon /home/alice/.gvfs fuse.gvfs-fuse-daemon rw,nosuid,nodev,user=alice 0 0

== See also ==
- df
- fstab
