= AppleJack =

Command-line interface for Mac OS X

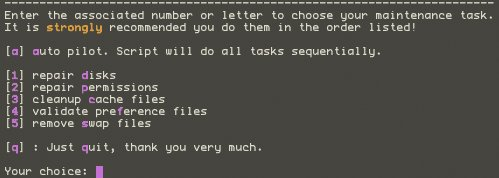
- AppleJack's main menu
- Developer: The Apotek
- Final release: 1.6 / 2010-07-12
- Operating system: Mac OS X
- Type: simplified interface for system repair
- License: GPL
- Website: applejack.sourceforge.net

AppleJack was a command-line interface for Mac OS X that provided a simplified user interface for single user mode system repairs. It allowed for permission repair, disk repair, cache cleaning, validation of preference- and property list files, and removal of swap files on a boot drive, without needing a separate startup disk.

With the introduction of the recovery partition in Mac OS X Lion and above, AppleJack development has ceased.
