= Berkeley Automounter =

am-utils
- Developer(s): Erez Zadok
- Stable release: 6.2 / Oct 30, 2014
- Operating system: Cross-platform
- Type: NFS Automounter
- License: BSD License
- Website: http://www.am-utils.org/

In computing the Berkeley Automounter (or amd) is a computer automounter daemon which first appeared in 4.4BSD in 1994. The original Berkeley automounter was created by Jan-Simon Pendry in 1989 and was donated to Berkeley. After languishing for a few years, the maintenance was picked up by Erez Zadok, who has maintained it since 1993.

The am-utils package which comprises and is included with FreeBSD, NetBSD, and OpenBSD. It is also included with a vast number of Linux distributions, including Red Hat Enterprise Linux, Fedora Core, ASPLinux, Trustix, Mandriva, and others.

The Berkeley automounter has a large number of contributors, including several who worked on the original automounter with Jan-Simon Pendry.

It is one of the oldest and more portable automounters available today, as well as the most flexible and the most widely used.

== Caveats ==
There are a few "side effects" that come with files that are mounted using automounter, these may differ depending on how the service was configured.

- Access time of automounted directories is initially set to the time automounter was used to mount them, however after the directories are accessed, this statistic changes.
- On some systems, directories are not visible until the first time they are used. This means commands such as ls will fail.
- If mounted directories are not used for a period of time, directories are unmounted.
- When automounter mounts directories, they are said to be owned by root until someone uses them, at that time the correct owner of the directory shows up.
