= Ls =

Shell command for listing files

ls
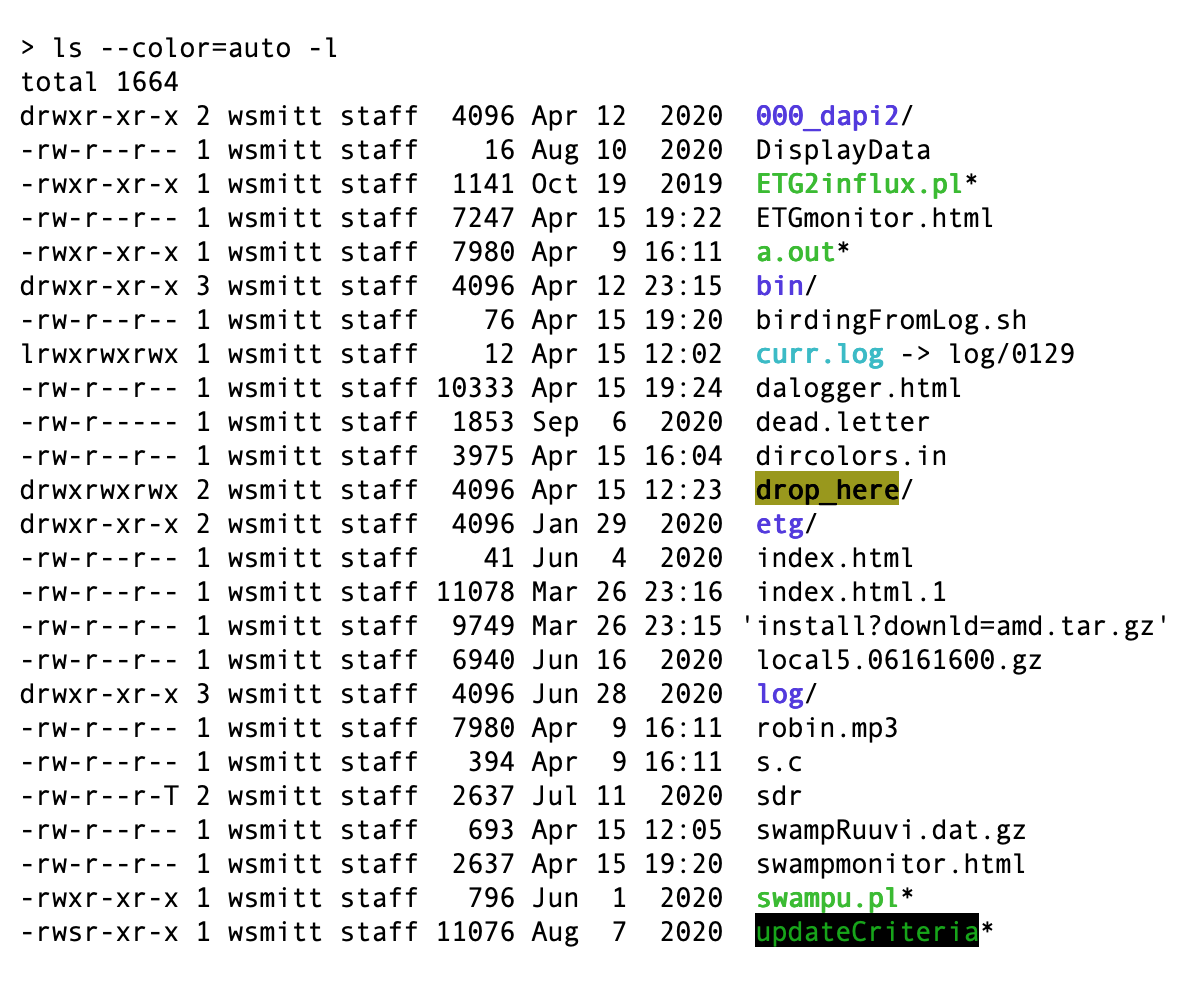
- Long file listing with ls --color=auto -l in Linux showing various modes, date formats, colors and appended indicators (executables and directories).
- Original authors: coreutils: Richard Stallman and David MacKenzie
- Developers: Various open-source and commercial developers
- Written in: C
- Operating system: Multics, Unix, Unix-like, Plan 9, Inferno, MSX-DOS
- Type: Command
- License: coreutils: GPLv3+ BusyBox: GPL-2.0-only; Toybox: 0BSD; Plan 9: MIT License

ls is a shell command for listing files – including special files such as directories. Originally developed for Unix and later codified by POSIX and Single UNIX Specification, it is supported in many operating systems today, including Unix-like variants, Windows (via PowerShell and UnxUtils), EFI, and MSX-DOS (via MSX-DOS2 Tools).

The numerical computing environments MATLAB and GNU Octave include an ls command with similar functionality.

An ls command appeared in the first version of AT&T UNIX. The name inherited from Multics and is short for "list". ls is part of the X/Open Portability Guide since issue 2 of 1987. It was inherited into the first version of POSIX.1 and the Single Unix Specification.

In MS-DOS, OS/2, and Windows, the equivalent command is dir. Apple DOS for the Apple II uses CATALOG.

== Behavior ==
When invoked with no path argument, ls lists the files of the working directory. Otherwise, it includes each specified file and each file of a specified directory.

Common options include:

- -a Includes all files, even those starting with ., which on Unix-based systems are otherwise not included
- -A Same as -a, but excludes the special entries . (working directory) and .. (parent of working directory)
- -l Selects the long output format which extends the default output of the file name with additional information including type (- for regular file, d for directory, l for symbolic link, n for network file, s for socket, p for named pipe (FIFO), c for character special file, bfor block special file), permissions, hard link count, owning user and group, size, last-modified timestamp
- -h Output sizes as so-called human readable by using units of KB, MB, GB instead of bytes. This option is not part of the POSIX standard, although implemented in several systems, e.g., GNU coreutils in 1997, FreeBSD 4.5 in 2002, and Solaris 9 also in 2002.
- -R Include files of a directory tree, recursively
- -t Sort the list by modification time (default sort is alphabetically)
- -u Sort the list by last access time
- -c Sort the list by last attribute (status) change time
- -r Reverse the order, for example most recent time last
- --full-time Show times down to the millisecond instead of just the minute
- -1 One entry per line
- -m Stream format; list items across the page, separated by commas.
- -g Include group but not owner
- -o Include owner but not group (when combined with -g both group and owner are suppressed)
- -d Show information about a directory or symbolic link, rather than the contents of a directory or the link's target
- -F Append a "/" to directory names, a "*" to executable files and a "@" to symbolic links

== Example ==
The following example shows the long form output:

$ ls -l
drwxr--r--   1 fjones editors     4096 Mar  2 12:52  drafts
-rw-r--r--   3 fjones editors    30405 Mar  2 12:52  edition-32
-r-xr-xr-x   1 fjones bookkeepers 8460 Jan 16  2022  edit.sh

Each output line includes a file type letter ('-' for file, 'd' for directory), 9 letters representing permissions, the number of hard links, owning user, owning group, size, modification date, name. In the working directory, the owner fjones has a directory named drafts, a regular file named edition-32, and an executable named edit.sh which is "old", i.e. modified more than 6 months ago as indicated by the display of the year.

┌─────────── file (not a directory)
|┌─────────── read-write (no execution) permissions for the owner
|│  ┌───────── read-only permissions for the group
|│  │  ┌─────── read-only permissions for others
|│  │  │     ┌── 3 hard links
|│  │  │     │   ┌── owning user
|│  │  │     │   │     ┌── owning group
|│  │  │     │   │     │          ┌── file size in bytes
|│  │  │     │   │     │          │    ┌── last modified on
|│  │  │     │   │     │          │    │                ┌── filename
-rw-r--r--   3 fjones editors    30405 Mar  2 12:52  edition-32

Some implementations support color output to indicate metadata. GNU ls provides the --color option which enables using a database to control colors maintained using dircolors. FreeBSD ls provides the -G option which enables using the termcap database The following example shows possible color output:

-rw-r--r--    1 tsmitt nregion   26650 Dec 20 11:16 audio.ogg
brw-r--r--    1 tsmitt nregion      64 Jan 27 05:52 bd-block-device
crw-r--r--    1 tsmitt nregion     255 Jan 26 13:57 cd-character-device
-rw-r--r--    1 tsmitt nregion     290 Jan 26 14:08 image.png
drwxrwxr-x    2 tsmitt nregion      48 Jan 26 11:28 di-directory
-rwxrwxr-x    1 tsmitt nregion      29 Jan 26 14:03 ex-executable
-rw-r--r--    1 tsmitt nregion       0 Dec 20 09:39 fi-regular-file
lrwxrwxrwx    1 tsmitt nregion       3 Jan 26 11:44 ln-soft-link -> dir
lrwxrwxrwx    1 tsmitt nregion      15 Dec 20 10:57 or-orphan-link -> mi-missing-link
drwxr-xrwx    2 tsmitt nregion    4096 Dec 20 10:58 ow-other-writeable-dir
prw-r--r--    1 tsmitt nregion       0 Jan 26 11:50 pi-pipe
-rwxr-sr-x    1 tsmitt nregion       0 Dec 20 11:05 sg-setgid
srw-rw-rw-    1 tsmitt nregion       0 Jan 26 12:00 so-socket
drwxr-xr-t    2 tsmitt nregion    4096 Dec 20 10:58 st-sticky-dir
-rwsr-xr-x    1 tsmitt nregion       0 Dec 20 11:09 su-setuid
-rw-r--r--    1 tsmitt nregion   10240 Dec 20 11:12 compressed.gz
drwxrwxrwt    2 tsmitt nregion    4096 Dec 20 11:10 tw-sticky-other-writeable-dir

== See also ==
- stat (Unix) – Unix system call for querying file metadata
- chown – Shell command for changing the owner of a file
- chgrp – Shell command for changing the group of a file
- du (Unix) – Shell command for reporting file system storage use
- mdls – Search feature found on Apple devices
- User identifier (Unix) – Value identifying a user account in Unix and Unix-like operating systems
- Group identifier (Unix) – Unix/POSIX system account group number; numeric value used to represent a specific group
- List of POSIX commands
- Unix directory structure – Directory structure used by a Unix-like operating system
