= User identifier =

Value identifying a user account in Unix and Unix-like operating systems

In Unix-like operating systems, a user identifier (often abbreviated to user ID or UID) is a value used to identify a user. The UID, along with the group identifier (GID) and other access control criteria, is used to determine which system resources a user can access. The password file maps textual user names to UIDs. UIDs are stored in the inodes of the Unix file system, running processes, tar archives, and the now-obsolete Network Information Service. In POSIX-compliant environments, the shell command id gives the current user's UID, as well as more information such as the user name and the primary and supplementary group identifiers (GIDs) and group names.

== Process attributes ==
The POSIX standard introduced three different UID fields into the process descriptor table, to allow privileged processes to take on different roles dynamically:

=== Effective user ID ===
The effective UID (euid) of a process is used for most access checks. It is also used as the owner for files created by that process.

=== File system user ID ===
Linux also has a file system user ID (fsuid) which is used explicitly for access control to the file system. It matches the euid unless explicitly set otherwise. It may be root's user ID only if ruid, suid, or euid is root. Whenever the euid is changed, the change is propagated to the fsuid.

The intent of fsuid is to permit programs (e.g., the NFS server) to limit themselves to the file system rights of some given uid without giving that uid permission to send them signals. Since kernel 2.0, the existence of fsuid is no longer necessary because Linux adheres to SUSv3 rules for sending signals, but fsuid remains for compatibility reasons.

=== Real user ID ===
The real UID (ruid) and real GID (rgid) identify the real owner of the process and affect the permissions for sending signals. A process without superuser privileges may signal another process only if the sender's ruid or euid matches receiver's ruid or suid. Because a child process inherits its credentials from its parent, a child and parent may signal each other.

=== Saved user ID ===
The saved user ID is used when a program running with elevated privileges needs to do some unprivileged work temporarily; changing euid from a privileged value (usually 0) to some unprivileged value (anything other than the privileged value) causes the privileged value to be stored in suid. Later, a program's euid can be set back to the value stored in suid, so that elevated privileges can be restored; an unprivileged process may set its euid to one of only three values: the value of ruid, the value of suid, or the value of euid.

== Conventions ==
=== Type ===
POSIX requires the UID to be an integer type. Most Unix-like operating systems represent the UID as an unsigned integer. The size of UID values varies amongst different systems; some UNIX OS's used 15-bit values, allowing values up to 32767, while others such as Linux (before version 2.4) supported 16-bit UIDs, making 65536 unique IDs possible. The majority of modern Unix-like systems (e.g., Solaris 2.0 in 1990, Linux 2.4 in 2001) have switched to 32-bit UIDs, allowing 4,294,967,296 (2^{32}) unique IDs.

=== Reserved ranges ===
The Linux Standard Base Core Specification specifies that UID values in the range 0 to 99 should be statically allocated by the system, and shall not be created by applications, while UIDs from 100 to 499 should be reserved for dynamic allocation by system administrators and post install scripts.

Debian Linux not only reserves the range 100–999 for dynamically allocated system users and groups, but also centrally and statically allocates users and groups in the range 60000-64999 and further reserves the range 65000–65533.

Systemd defines a number of special UID ranges, including

- 60001-60513: UIDs for home directories managed by systemd-homed
- 61184-65519 (0xef00-0xffef): UIDs for dynamic users

On FreeBSD, porters who need a UID for their package can pick a free one from the range 50 to 999 and then register the static allocation.

Some POSIX systems allocate UIDs for new users starting from 500 (macOS, Red Hat Enterprise Linux till version 6), others start at 1000 (Red Hat Enterprise Linux since version 7, openSUSE, Debian). On many Linux systems, these ranges are specified in /etc/login.defs, for useradd and similar tools.

Central UID allocations in enterprise networks (e.g., via LDAP and NFS servers) may limit themselves to using only UID numbers well above 1000, and outside the range 60000–65535, to avoid potential conflicts with UIDs locally allocated on client computers. When new users are created locally, the local system is supposed to check for and avoid conflicts with UID's already existing on NSS. (Note: for both allocation ranges: when an UID allocation takes place NSS is checked for collisions first, and a different UID is picked if an entry is found)

OS-level virtualization can remap user identifiers, e.g. using Linux namespaces, and therefore need to allocate ranges into which remapped UIDs and GIDs are mapped:

- snapd maps UIDs and GIDs into the range 524288-589823 (0x80000-0x8ffff)
- systemd-nspawn automatic allocates of per-container UID ranges uses the range 524288-1879048191 (0x80000-0x6fffffff)

The systemd authors recommend that OS-level virtualization systems should allocate 65536 (2^{16}) UIDs per container, and map them by adding an integer multiple of 2^{16}.

=== Special values ===
- 0: The superuser normally has a UID of zero (0).
- −1: The value (uid_t) -1 is reserved by POSIX to identify an omitted argument.
- 65535: This value is still avoided because it was the API error return value when uid_t was 16 bits.
- Nobody: Historically, the user "nobody" was assigned UID -2 by several operating systems, although other values such as 2^{15}−1 = 32,767 are also in use, such as by OpenBSD. For compatibility between 16-bit and 32-bit UIDs, many Linux distributions now set it to be 2^{16}−2 = 65,534; the Linux kernel defaults to returning this value when a 32-bit UID does not fit into the return value of the 16-bit system calls. Fedora Linux assigns the last UID of the range statically allocated for system use (0–99) to nobody: 99, and calls 65534 instead nfsnobody.

== Alternatives ==
NFSv4 was intended to help avoid numeric identifier collisions by identifying users (and groups) in protocol packets using textual "user@domain" names rather than integer numbers. However, as long as operating-system kernels and local file systems continue to use integer user identifiers, this comes at the expense of additional translation steps (using idmap daemon processes), which can introduce additional failure points if local UID mapping mechanisms or databases get configured incorrectly, lost, or out of sync. The "@domain" part of the user name could be used to indicate which authority allocated a particular name, for example in form of

- a Kerberos realm name
- an Active Directory domain name
- the name of an operating-system vendor (for distribution-specific allocations)
- the name of a computer (for device-specific allocations)

But in practice many existing implementations only allow setting the NFSv4 domain to a fixed value, thereby rendering it useless.

== See also ==
- FAT access rights
- File-system permissions
- Open (system call)
- Process identifier
- Security Identifier (SID) – the Windows NT equivalent
- setuid
- Sticky bit
