= Findstr =

Shell command for searching text files

findstr
- Other names: qgrep
- Developers: Microsoft, ReactOS Contributors
- Operating system: Windows, ReactOS
- Platform: Cross-platform
- Type: Command
- License: Windows: Proprietary commercial software ReactOS: GNU General Public License
- Website: docs.microsoft.com/en-us/windows-server/administration/windows-commands/findstr

findstr is a shell command that searches for text in files and prints matching lines to standard output. The command provides similar functionality as find, but findstr supports some regular expression operators. However, findstr does not support UTF-16 whereas find does. findstr cannot search for null bytes commonly found in Unicode computer files.

findstr was first released as part of the Windows 2000 Resource Kit under the name qgrep. The command is available in Windows and ReactOS.

== Use ==
The command syntax can be described as:

findstr FLAGS TEXT PATH...

TEXT
Text to search for.

PATH
Path to a file.

FLAGS:

/B
Match pattern if at the beginning of a line.

/E
Match pattern if at the end of a line.

/L
Use search strings literally.

/R
Use search strings as regular expressions.

/S
Search for matching files in the current directory and all subdirectories.

/I
Ignore case for matching.

/X
Print lines that match exactly.

/V
Print lines that do not match.

/N
Print the line number before each line that matches.

/M
Print only the file name if a file contains a match.

/O
Print character offset before each matching line.

/P
Skip files with non-printable characters.

/OFF[LINE]
Do not skip files with offline attribute set.

/A:attr
Specifies color attribute with two hex digits. See "color /?"

/F:file
Reads file list from the specified file (/ for console).

/C:string
Use specified string as a literal search string.

/G:file
Get search strings from the specified file (/ for console).

/D:dir
Search a semicolon delimited list of directories

/?
Print help information about the command.

== Example ==
The following command searches the file named "services.txt" for lines containing "network" ignoring case.

findstr /i "network" services.txt

== See also ==
- List of DOS commands
- Find (Unix) – Shell command for finding files
- grep – Command-line utility for text search
