= Trajpar =

trajpar is a system parameter in Creo Elements/Pro that varies from 0 to 1 across the length of a given path. It is used to create complex geometric and non-geometric shapes that vary in dimension along the length of any given path.

== Naming ==
trajpar derives from the words: trajectory parameter. It is a pseudo-variable as it is controlled not by any mathematical representation, but by the physical representation of a path, i.e. a trajectory.

== Syntax ==
sd3=evalgraph('graph1',trajpar*100) Where sd3= A variable inside the variable section sweep that will be driven by a graph feature called 'graph1'

== Uses and notability ==
trajpar can be used with various mathematical functions to create alternating, flaring, bowing or sinusoidal protrusions. It is primarily used in conjunction with the variable section sweep command in Creo but can also remove material if desired.

trajpar typifies what makes Creo different from many other CAD software systems. The level of complexity and control given to the user is much greater than, for example other design or engineering software like SolidWorks or Alias

== Samples ==
To create an undulating wave, a sinusoid might be desired:

$$d1=sin(trajpar \cdot 8\pi)$$

A flare:

$$d1=1 + trajpar^2$$

etc., where d1 is the dimension to be controlled.

== See also ==
- Creo Elements/Pro
- SolidWorks
- Unigraphics
- AutoCAD
