= Fdupes =

Program to scan directories for duplicate files

fdupes
- Original author: Adrián López
- Release: 25 December 1999; 26 years ago
- Stable release: 2.4.0 / 30 March 2025; 18 months ago
- Written in: C
- Operating system: Linux, macOS
- Available in: English
- Repository: github.com/adrianlopezroche/fdupes

fdupes is a program written by Adrián López to scan directories for duplicate files, with options to list, delete or replace the files with hardlinks pointing to the duplicate. It first compares file sizes, partial MD5 signatures, full MD5 signatures, and then performs a byte-by-byte comparison for verification.

fdupes is written in C and is released under the MIT License.
