= Language Interface Pack =

In Microsoft terminology, a Language Interface Pack (LIP) is a skin for localizing a Windows operating system in languages such as Hindi, Marathi, Kannada, Tamil, and Macedonian. Based on Multilingual User Interface (MUI) "technology", a LIP also requires the software to have a base installed language and provides users with an approximately 80 percent localized user experience by translating a reduced set of user interface elements. Unlike MUI packs which are available only to Microsoft volume license customers and for specific SKUs of Windows Vista, a Language Interface Pack is available for free and can be installed on a licensed copy of Microsoft Windows or Office and a fixed "base language". In other words, if the desired additional language has incomplete localization, users may add it for free, while if the language has complete localization, the user must pay for it by licensing a premium version of Windows. (In Windows Vista and Windows 7, only the Enterprise and Ultimate editions are "multilingual".)

Typically, a Language Interface Pack is designed for regional markets that do not have full MUI packs or fully localized versions of a product. It is an intermediate localized solution that enables computer users to adapt their software to display many commonly used features in their native language. Each new Language Interface Pack is built using the glossary created by the Community Glossary Project in cooperation with the local government, academia, and local linguistic experts.
