= Multilingual User Interface =

Integrated localization feature in modern Windows systems

- The Windows 7 Start menu in English (left) and Japanese (right), localized using MUI
- Other names: MUI
- Developer: Microsoft
- Initial release: February 17, 2000
- Written in: C++
- Included with: Microsoft Windows, Windows Phone
- Predecessor: Static localization
- License: Proprietary
- Website: Microsoft Learn - Multilingual User Interface

The Multilingual User Interface (MUI) is a dynamic localization framework used in Microsoft Windows, Windows Phone, and compatible programs; it allows language files to be modular and separate from application logic. It is designed to simplify the development and deployment of localized software.

MUI has a number of advantages compared to traditional static localization. Software that uses MUI can do the following:

- Store language resources in dedicated files instead of hardcoding them into program binaries, making it possible to update localizations and code dynamically without recompilation.
- Automatically select a language from Windows' language preferences, instead of asking the user at runtime.
- Use the Win32 API to load resources from MUI language files.

The MUI framework, API, and its localization files (called Language Packs, or LPs) were introduced in Windows 2000; these were significantly expanded on with Windows Vista, which allowed developers to use MUI in their software. Language Interface Packs (LIPs) were added in Windows 7 to supplement Language Packs. LIPs were replaced by Local Experience Packs (LXPs) in Windows 10 build 1809.

== Overview ==
The MUI technology is integrated into Windows, and can be used in an application by storing localizable resources in a language file and using the MUI API to load those resources at runtime.

A relatively simple implementation of MUI in an application stores the strings of each language in a string-table resource of the binary file and uses the Win32 function LoadString to load strings at runtime. No other MUI-related configuration or code is required. The following optional capabilities of MUI can be implemented if desired:

- Store the resources of each language in a separate DLL in order to enable deployment/installation flexibility
- An application can use dedicated MUI functions to provide more control of localizable asset consumption such as using a language other than the system-defined user preference
- Localizable assets can be stored in a format other than resources.

The design of MUI attempts to provide a common way to store application localization information that alleviates limitations of more traditional and monolithic designs for localization such as including all languages in the application logic files (i.e. resources). With MUI, the following deployment scenarios are possible:

- Add support for a language by installing only Language Packs—without modifying application logic or other language files
- Add new features and fix bugs by installing only application logic files—without having to include localized strings

== Technological components ==
=== Terminology ===
The following MUI-related terms are either used in or derived from the Microsoft documentation:

Language-neutral (LN): Something that conveys a meaning regardless of the languages of the viewer, such as an image without text or other localizable aspects

LN resource: A resource that is shared by and installed for all language versions of the application

LN file: A Windows binary containing application logic and language-neutral resources.

Language-specific (LS): Describes something that varies significantly by language. The most common LS items are interface strings but can be other items, such as an image that contains text.

LS resource file: A set of resources localized for one language; also called an MUI file.

=== Language preferences ===
A language selection is stored by the system for the system (shared by all users and maybe used as default for a new user) and for each user. These selections can be modified by the user via the system Control Panel but cannot be modified by an application.

These preferences control the language that the OS uses for UI elements. Applications can also use these preferences, and via MUI-enabled system functions (such as LoadString) the use is automatic and transparent (requires no MUI-specific code to use). But use of these preferences is optional and customizable. An application can be designed to ignore the language preferences. Or it may use them in ways other than that provided by MUI-enabled system functions.

An application can use MUI functions to read language preferences—that default to the user selection [assumed] and are a list of languages in preference order. These preferences are provided at the system, user, process and thread levels [assumed that changing at a higher level modifies the preferences for lower levels].

An application can modify these language preference lists (via SetThreadPreferredUILanguages and other functions) in order to influence the behavior of MUI. For example:

LPCWSTR languageIdSpec = L"en-US\0";
ULONG langCount = 1;
if (!SetThreadPreferredUILanguages(MUI_LANGUAGE_NAME, languageIdSpec, &langCount))
    MessageBoxW(NULL, L"Unable to set thread preferred UI language.", NULL, MB_ICONERROR);

=== Resource storage ===
MUI provides support for localized resources stored in Windows binary (a.k.a. Win32 PE) files (DLL, EXE, SYS) -- usually DLL files.

The resources for a language can either be stored in the application binary or in a MUI (a.k.a. LS) file—one per language. For MUI to find resources, a MUI file must be in the same directory as its associated LN file and be named the same as the LN file plus ".LCID.mui". For example, for LN file my-lib.dll, the MUI file for en-US would be named my-lib.dll.0409.mui.

String resources are coded as string table like so:

LANGUAGE LANG_ENGLISH, SUBLANG_NEUTRAL
STRINGTABLE
BEGIN
1 L"message text"
END

=== Resource retrieval ===
Several Win32 functions that read application resources are compatible with MUI, including LoadString, FormatMessage, and LoadImage.

Each function attempts to read a resource for a language as selected by global language preferences, from application resources or associated MUI files (co-located with LN file and following naming convention). Each uses the global language preferences to choose a language that is available. If loading the resource for the first preferred language fails either because the MUI file does not exist or the resource does not exist in the MUI file, the function will try the next preferred language and so on until all preferences have been tried. If load fails for all preferred languages, then tries the LN file.

The most commonly used function is LoadString which loads strings from a string-table resource. Example using LoadString:

wchar_t *resourceCharArray;
int resourceLength = LoadStringW(moduleHandle, resourceId, (LPWSTR)&resourceCharArray, 0);
if (!resourceLength)
{
    MessageBoxW(NULL, L"Unable to find resource.", NULL, MB_ICONERROR);
    return -1;
}

wchar_t *text = (LPWSTR)malloc((resourceLength + 1) * sizeof(wchar_t));
wcsncpy(text, resourceCharArray, resourceLength);
text[resourceLength] = L'\0'; // null terminate

This retrieves the address of the resource text character buffer which is not guaranteed to be null terminated. Then, this copies the characters to a new buffer and appends a null terminator. Another option is to have LoadString copy the string to a passed buffer, but that requires using a fixed-length buffer which has downsides like usually allocating more than needed or truncation if too short.

Oddly, MS documentation for LoadString does not mention its interaction with MUI—use of language preference.

FormatMessage is also MUI-enabled. Its function reference page describes its interaction with the user's language preference when parameter dwLanguageId is passed as 0. But FormatMessage reads from a message table, not a string table and as Raymond Chen says, "nobody actually uses message tables".

=== Non-Resource Storage and Retrieval ===
MS documentation recommends storing UI assets as resources since MUI fully supports retrieving from this storage, but it notes that MUI supports any other file format, such as XML, JSON or flat text file. This implies that using the resource retrieval aspect of MUI is not required for an application to be MUI-enabled. An application can use its own, custom UI asset retrieval logic.

To be MUI-enabled, the application must use the system language preferences. The custom UI asset retrieval logic might optionally use the MUI function GetFileMUIPath to leverage the MUI file location and naming conventions.

=== Other Aspects ===
The MS MUI documentation describes the following concepts, but it is unclear how they relate to MUI and what value they offer:

- Resource Configuration File
- Registry String Redirection

== Implementation ==
Basic implementation of MUI entails the following:

- Use LoadString to read resources, taking into consideration user preferences and system settings to serve the best available localization.
- Author resource source code (RC) for each language; it is recommended to store each language in a separate RC file.

Upon completing the basic tasks, an application is compatible with MUI, but there are other MUI features that an application can take advantage of.

A program that uses MUI can store localization directly in its binaries; this provides all the runtime localization benefits of MUI and simple, single-file deployment, but does not allow for deployment flexibility that MUI provides. In order to take advantage of the deployment flexibility:

- Separate localized strings from application logic
- Store your localization in Language Packs, separated by language. You can also use LIPs or LXPs to store localization data.
- Place these Language Packs in the same directory as the application binary.

To store localized assets in formats other than resources, the application must implement a mechanism for reading assets at runtime based on the system's language preferences (see GetThreadUILanguage). In other words, the application loads UI assets based on preferences without using LoadString; the application may leverage the MUI file-per-language location and naming convention by using GetFileMUIPath.

== Advantages over static localization ==
The MUI technology was developed in response to, and as an improvement over, static localization—an older technology for globalizing and deploying software packages.

Software localized via a Language Pack achieves the same goal as a static localization, but there are key differences. While both display menus and dialogs in the targeted language, only a localized version uses translated file and folder names.

In Windows, a system-wide Language Pack translates the base operating system, as well as all MUI-capable applications, into a particular language. Localized versions of Windows support upgrading from a previous localized version and user interface resources are completely localized, which is not the case for MUI versions of a product.

A Language Pack does not translate administrative content such as registry entries and items in the Microsoft Management Console.

One advantage of MUI is that each Windows user can set a different language. For a version of Windows that only has static localization, this is not possible. With MUI, a single piece of software can support multiple languages, and the OS and applications use the user's set language. In addition, an operating system that is localized with a particular Language Pack can run applications that are localized with different Language Packs.

== History ==
MUI was introduced with Windows 2000 and is supported in each subsequent Windows release.

=== Windows 2000 and Windows XP ===
MUI products for these versions were available only through volume agreements from Microsoft. They were not available through retail channels. However, some OEMs distributed the product.

==== Languages in Windows XP ====
In Windows 2000 and XP, Language Packs for a product replace hardcoded American English strings. There are a total of 5 Language Pack sets.

Set 1

- Deutsch - German
- Français - French
- 한국어 - Korean
- 中文 (简体) - Chinese (Simplified)
- 中文 (繁體) - Chinese (Traditional)
- 日本語 - Japanese

Set 2

- Español - Spanish
- Italiano - Italian
- Nederlands - Dutch
- Português (Brasil) - Portuguese (Brazil)
- Svenska - Swedish
- עברית - Hebrew
- العربية - Arabic

Set 3

- Čeština - Czech
- Dansk - Danish
- Norsk bokmål - Norwegian Bokmål
- Suomi - Finnish
- Русский - Russian

Set 4

- Magyar - Hungarian
- Polski - Polish
- Português (Portugal) - Portuguese (Portugal)
- Türkçe - Turkish
- Ελληνικά - Greek

Set 5

- Eesti - Estonian
- Hrvatski - Croatian
- Latviešu - Latvian
- Lietuvių - Lithuanian
- Română - Romanian
- Slovenčina - Slovak
- Slovenščina - Slovenian
- Български - Bulgarian
- ไทย - Thai

=== Windows Vista ===
Windows Vista updated the MUI protocol to separate language resources from the application logic binary files; the application logic files are now language-independent (no longer containing American English). This separation allows for true language switching, and to have multiple Language Packs independent of the application logic binaries. Languages are applied as Language Packs containing the resources required to localize the user interface.

Language Packs are available for Windows Vista Enterprise and as an optional extra for Windows Vista Ultimate.

Beginning with Windows Vista, MUI APIs were also made available to developers for application development. This allowed third-party developers to use the MUI technology.

At launch, the following 16 language packs were released:

- Dansk - Danish
- Deutsch - German
- English - English
- Español - Spanish
- Français - French
- Italiano - Italian
- Nederlands - Dutch
- Norsk bokmål - Norwegian Bokmål
- Português (Brasil) - Portuguese (Brazil)
- Suomi - Finnish
- Svenska - Swedish
- Русский - Russian
- 한국어 - Korean
- 中文 (简体) - Chinese (Simplified)
- 中文 (繁體) - Chinese (Traditional)
- 日本語 - Japanese

On October 23, 2007, an additional 19 language packs were released:

- Čeština - Czech
- Eesti - Estonian
- Hrvatski - Croatian
- Latviešu - Latvian
- Lietuvių - Lithuanian
- Magyar - Hungarian
- Polski - Polish
- Português (Portugal) - Portuguese (Portugal)
- Română - Romanian
- Slovenčina - Slovak
- Slovenščina - Slovenian
- Srpski - Serbian (Latin)
- Türkçe - Turkish
- Ελληνικά - Greek
- Български - Bulgarian
- Українська - Ukrainian
- עברית - Hebrew
- العربية - Arabic
- ไทย - Thai

=== Windows 7 ===
Language Packs are available for Windows 7 Enterprise and Ultimate, as well as Windows Phone 7.

Beginning with Windows 7, Microsoft introduced a new format of language pack, called a Language Interface Pack (abbreviated as LIP). These serve to provide partial translations that are not present in a base LP.

==== List of languages in Windows 7 (PC) ====
At launch, the following 15 language packs were released (Chinese (Hong Kong) is not available on mobile):

- Deutsch - German
- English (United Kingdom) - English (United Kingdom)
- English (United States) - English (United States)
- Español - Spanish
- Français - French
- Italiano - Italian
- Nederlands - Dutch
- Polski - Polish
- Português (Brasil) - Portuguese (Brazil)
- Русский - Russian
- 한국어 - Korean
- 中文 (简体) - Chinese (Simplified)
- 中文 (繁體) - Chinese (Traditional)
- 中文 (香港) - Chinese (Hong Kong)
- 日本語 - Japanese

On October 31, 2009, an additional 22 language packs were released (Estonian, Croatian, Latvian, Lithuanian, Romanian, Slovak, Slovenian, Serbian, Bulgarian, Hebrew, Arabic, and Thai are not available on mobile):

- Čeština - Czech
- Dansk - Danish
- Eesti - Estonian
- Hrvatski - Croatian
- Latviešu - Latvian
- Lietuvių - Lithuanian
- Magyar - Hungarian
- Norsk bokmål - Norwegian Bokmål
- Português (Portugal) - Portuguese (Portugal)
- Română - Romanian
- Slovenčina - Slovak
- Slovenščina - Slovenian
- Srpski - Serbian (Latin)
- Suomi - Finnish
- Svenska - Swedish
- Türkçe - Turkish
- Ελληνικά - Greek
- Български - Bulgarian
- Українська - Ukrainian
- עברית - Hebrew
- العربية - Arabic
- ไทย - Thai

==== List of languages in Windows Phone 7 ====
At launch, only six languages were supported:

- Deutsch - German
- English (United Kingdom) - English (United Kingdom)
- English (United States) - English (United States)
- Español - Spanish
- Français - French
- Italiano - Italian

With the launch of Windows Phone 7.5 on September 27, 2011, twenty more languages are added (Turkish and Ukrainian are not supported as display languages until Windows Phone 8). The first LIPs for Windows Phone 7 were Indonesian and Malay with the Tango update.

- Bahasa Indonesia - Indonesian
- Bahasa Melayu - Malay
- Čeština - Czech
- Dansk - Danish
- Magyar - Hungarian
- Nederlands - Dutch
- Norsk bokmål - Norwegian Bokmål
- Polski - Polish
- Português (Brasil) - Portuguese (Brazil)
- Português (Portugal) - Portuguese (Portugal)
- Suomi - Finnish
- Svenska - Swedish
- Türkçe - Turkish
- Ελληνικά - Greek
- Русский - Russian
- Українська - Ukrainian
- 한국어 - Korean
- 中文 (简体) - Chinese (Simplified)
- 中文 (繁體) - Chinese (Traditional)
- 日本語 - Japanese

=== Windows 8/8.1/RT ===
Beginning with Windows 8/RT, almost all editions of Windows are able to download and install Language Packs and LIPs, with a few exceptions:

- In Single Language editions of Windows, only one LP is allowed to be installed, the same behavior as editions of Windows 7 and earlier that are not Enterprise or Ultimate.
- In OEM editions of Windows, the exact LIPs that are preinstalled/available for download depend on the device manufacturer and country/region of purchase (and the mobile operator for devices with cellular connectivity). This is a mixture of a local-market feature and a feature for everyone everywhere. There may be multiple display languages preinstalled on the device by the manufacturer and/or wireless carrier, but each manufacturer and/or wireless carrier installs two different sets of languages: one set of preloaded languages and one set of languages that can be installed by the end user. This rule is currently used in Windows Phones as of Windows Phone 7 and PCs as of Windows 8 (since Windows 8 and Windows Phone 8 share the same Windows NT kernel) and was later dropped in Windows 10 version 1803, but was later quietly reinstated as of Windows 10 version 1809. An end user could install a retail license on top of an OEM license by performing a clean install through the Media Creation Tool to circumvent the region locking and install any display language that they want.
  - The Windows update process does not affect the currently installed display languages in any way, but it may give the end user access to newly released language packs made available by the OEM (PCs only). However, when installing a new feature update, it may change the display language back to the one set during the initial setup process. For example, if the Samsung ATIV Smart PC on AT&T is upgraded from Windows 8.1 to Windows 10 Anniversary Update, it will now be able to install Portuguese (Brazil), Vietnamese, Chinese (Simplified and Traditional), and Japanese in addition to English, Spanish, French, German, Italian, and Korean (the last three languages can be downloaded by the end user at the time of its launch), just like with the Galaxy S8 series and the Verizon-based Galaxy Book.
  - On the other hand, a Samsung Galaxy Book device does not support Afrikaans as a display language, because Samsung apps do not officially support Afrikaans. Furthermore, cellular variants of the Galaxy Book laptops sold in North America support fewer display languages than their Wi-Fi-only counterparts, just like on Samsung smartphones.
  - Certain language packs like English (Australia) and English (Canada) are only supported on the Xbox consoles and the Surface Duo.
  - Some LIPs require certain Language Packs to be present or compatible. If the Language Pack dependency is not present or compatible, then that LIP cannot be installed on that device.
  - Unlike desktop versions of Windows, Windows Phone used the lightweighted MUIs, and OEM (such as Nokia and HTC) may preload all MUIs on flagship models of Windows Phone.

=== Windows 10 ===
Beginning with Windows 10 version 1803, Microsoft phased out LIPs in favor of Local Experience Packs (LXPs). In addition to installation via Windows Settings, LXPs are also available through the Microsoft Store; the latter enabling remote installation for consumer editions of Windows. As with all applications from the Microsoft Store, only the LXPs that are compatible with that Windows device are shown in the Microsoft Store app.

== Supported languages ==
Supported languages by OS version are as follows:

=== PC ===
MUI Language Packs by Windows version
Language	English name	2000	XP	Vista	7.0	7.1	8.0	8.1	10	11
العربية	Arabic	Yes	Yes	Yes	Yes	Yes	Yes	Yes	Yes	Yes
Български	Bulgarian	No	Yes	Yes	Yes	Yes	Yes	Yes	Yes	Yes
Català	Catalan (Spain)	No	LIP	LIP	LIP	LIP	LIP	LIP	LIP	Yes
Čeština	Czech	Yes	Yes	Yes	Yes	Yes	Yes	Yes	Yes	Yes
Dansk	Danish	Yes	Yes	Yes	Yes	Yes	Yes	Yes	Yes	Yes
Deutsch	German	Yes	Yes	Yes	Yes	Yes	Yes	Yes	Yes	Yes
Ελληνικά	Greek	Yes	Yes	Yes	Yes	Yes	Yes	Yes	Yes	Yes
English (United Kingdom)	English (United Kingdom)	No	No	No	No	No	Yes	Yes	Yes	Yes
English (United States)	English (United States)	Yes	Yes	Yes	Yes	Yes	Yes	Yes	Yes	Yes
Español (España)	Spanish (Spain)	Yes	Yes	Yes	Yes	Yes	Yes	Yes	Yes	Yes
Español (México)	Spanish (Mexico)	No	No	No	No	No	No	No	Yes	Yes
Eesti	Estonian	No	Yes	Yes	Yes	Yes	Yes	Yes	Yes	Yes
Euskara	Basque	No	LIP	LIP	LIP	LIP	LIP	LIP	LIP	Yes
Suomi	Finnish	Yes	Yes	Yes	Yes	Yes	Yes	Yes	Yes	Yes
Français (Canada)	French (Canada)	No	No	No	No	No	No	No	Yes	Yes
Français (France)	French (France)	Yes	Yes	Yes	Yes	Yes	Yes	Yes	Yes	Yes
Galego	Galician	No	LIP	LIP	LIP	LIP	LIP	LIP	LIP	Yes
עברית	Hebrew	Yes	Yes	Yes	Yes	Yes	Yes	Yes	Yes	Yes
Hrvatski	Croatian	No	Yes	Yes	Yes	Yes	Yes	Yes	Yes	Yes
Magyar	Hungarian	Yes	Yes	Yes	Yes	Yes	Yes	Yes	Yes	Yes
Indonesia	Indonesian	No	LIP	LIP	LIP	LIP	LIP	LIP	LIP	Yes
Italiano	Italian	Yes	Yes	Yes	Yes	Yes	Yes	Yes	Yes	Yes
日本語	Japanese	Yes	Yes	Yes	Yes	Yes	Yes	Yes	Yes	Yes
한국어	Korean	Yes	Yes	Yes	Yes	Yes	Yes	Yes	Yes	Yes
Lietuvių	Lithuanian	No	Yes	Yes	Yes	Yes	Yes	Yes	Yes	Yes
Latviešu	Latvian	No	Yes	Yes	Yes	Yes	Yes	Yes	Yes	Yes
Norsk bokmål	Norwegian Bokmål	Yes	Yes	Yes	Yes	Yes	Yes	Yes	Yes	Yes
Nederlands	Dutch	Yes	Yes	Yes	Yes	Yes	Yes	Yes	Yes	Yes
Polski	Polish	Yes	Yes	Yes	Yes	Yes	Yes	Yes	Yes	Yes
Português (Brasil)	Portuguese (Brazil)	Yes	Yes	Yes	Yes	Yes	Yes	Yes	Yes	Yes
Português (Portugal)	Portuguese (Portugal)	Yes	Yes	Yes	Yes	Yes	Yes	Yes	Yes	Yes
Română	Romanian	No	Yes	Yes	Yes	Yes	Yes	Yes	Yes	Yes
Русский	Russian	Yes	Yes	Yes	Yes	Yes	Yes	Yes	Yes	Yes
Slovenčina	Slovak	No	Yes	Yes	Yes	Yes	Yes	Yes	Yes	Yes
Slovenščina	Slovenian	No	Yes	Yes	Yes	Yes	Yes	Yes	Yes	Yes
Srpski	Serbian (Latin)	No	LIP	Yes	Yes	Yes	Yes	Yes	Yes	Yes
Svenska	Swedish	Yes	Yes	Yes	Yes	Yes	Yes	Yes	Yes	Yes
ไทย	Thai	No	Yes	Yes	Yes	Yes	Yes	Yes	Yes	Yes
Türkçe	Turkish	Yes	Yes	Yes	Yes	Yes	Yes	Yes	Yes	Yes
Українська	Ukrainian	No	LIP	Yes	Yes	Yes	Yes	Yes	Yes	Yes
Tiếng Việt	Vietnamese	No	LIP	LIP	LIP	LIP	LIP	LIP	LIP	Yes
中文 (简体)	Chinese (Simplified)	Yes	Yes	Yes	Yes	Yes	Yes	Yes	Yes	Yes
中文 (香港特別行政區)	Chinese (Hong Kong)	Yes	Yes	Yes	Yes	Yes	Yes	Yes	Yes	Yes
中文 (繁體)	Chinese (Traditional)	Yes	Yes	Yes	Yes	Yes	Yes	Yes	Yes	Yes

Language Interface Packs by Windows version
Language	English name	Base language required	XP	Vista	7.0	7.1	8.0	8.1	10	11
Afrikaans	Afrikaans	English	Yes	Yes	Yes	Yes	Yes	Yes	Yes	Yes
አማርኛ	Amharic	English			Yes	Yes				
অসমীয়া	Assamese	English			Yes	Yes				
Azərbaycan	Azerbaijani	English	Yes		Yes	Yes				
Беларуская	Belarusian	Russian		Yes	Yes	Yes	Yes	Yes	Yes	Yes
বাংলা (বাংলাদেশ)	Bangla (Bangladesh)	English			Yes	Yes				
বাংলা (ভারত)	Bangla (India)	English	Yes		Yes	Yes				
Босански	Bosnian (Cyrillic)	Russian			Yes	Yes				
Bosanski	Bosnian (Latin)	English	Yes		Yes	Yes				
Català	Catalan (Spain)	English	Yes	Yes	Yes	Yes	Yes	Yes	Yes	MUI
Valencià	Catalan (Spain, Valencian)	Spanish								
ᏣᎳᎩ	Cherokee	English								
Cymraeg	Welsh	English	Yes		Yes	Yes				
Euskara	Basque	Spanish	Yes	Yes	Yes	Yes	Yes	Yes	Yes	MUI
فارسى	Persian (Iran)	English	Yes	Yes	Yes	Yes	Yes	Yes	Yes	Yes
Filipino	Filipino	English			Yes	Yes				
Gaeilge	Irish	English	Yes			Yes				
Gàidhlig	Scottish Gaelic	English								
Galego	Galician	Spanish	Yes			Yes				MUI
ગુજરાતી	Gujarati	English	Yes			Yes				
Hausa	Hausa	English				Yes				
हिन्दी	Hindi	English	Yes			Yes			Yes	
Հայերեն	Armenian	English	Yes			Yes				
Indonesia	Indonesian	English	Yes			Yes				MUI
Igbo	Igbo	English				Yes				
Íslenska	Icelandic	English	Yes	Yes	Yes	Yes	Yes	Yes	Yes	Yes
ᐃᓄᒃᑎᑐᑦ	Inuktitut	English	Yes			Yes				
ქართული	Georgian	English	Yes			Yes				
Қазақ тілі	Kazakh	English	Yes			Yes				
ខ្មែរ	Khmer	English				Yes				
ಕನ್ನಡ	Kannada	English	Yes			Yes				
कोंकणी	Konkani	English	Yes			Yes				
کوردیی ناوەڕاست	Central Kurdish	English								
Кыргызча	Kyrgyz	Russian				Yes				
Lëtzebuergesch	Luxembourgish	French	Yes			Yes				
ລາວ	Lao	Thai								
Te reo Māori	Maori	English	Yes			Yes				
Македонски	Macedonian	English	Yes			Yes				
മലയാളം	Malayalam	English	Yes			Yes				
Монгол	Mongolian	English								
मराठी	Marathi	English	Yes			Yes				
Melayu (Brunei)	Malay (Brunei)	English				Yes				
Melayu (Malaysia)	Malay (Malaysia)	English	Yes			Yes				
Malti	Maltese	English	Yes			Yes				
नेपाली	Nepali	English	Yes			Yes				
Norsk nynorsk	Norwegian Nynorsk	Norwegian Bokmål	Yes	Yes	Yes	Yes	Yes	Yes	Yes	Yes
Sesotho sa Leboa	Southern Sotho	English				Yes				
ଓଡ଼ିଆ	Odia	English				Yes				
پنجابی	Punjabi (Arabic, Pakistan)	English								
ਪੰਜਾਬੀ	Punjabi (Gurmukhi, India)	English	Yes			Yes				
درى	Persian (Afghanistan)	English			Yes	Yes				
K'iche'	K'iche'	Spanish								
Runasimi	Quechua	Spanish	Yes			Yes				
Kinyarwanda	Kinyarwanda	English								
سنڌي	Sindhi	English								
සිංහල	Sinhala	English								
Shqip	Albanian	English	Yes	Yes	Yes	Yes	Yes	Yes	Yes	Yes
Српски (Босна и Херцеговина)	Serbian (Bosnia & Herzegovina)	English								
Српски (Србија)	Serbian (Serbia)	Serbian (Latin)	Yes	Yes	Yes	Yes	Yes	Yes	Yes	Yes
Kiswahili	Swahili	English	Yes			Yes				
தமிழ்	Tamil	English	Yes			Yes				
తెలుగు	Telugu	English	Yes			Yes				
Тоҷикӣ	Tajik	Russian								
ትግር	Tigrinya	English								
Türkmen dili	Turkmen	Russian								
Setswana	Tswana	English	Yes							
Татар	Tatar	Russian	Yes			Yes				
ئۇيغۇرچە	Uyghur	Chinese (Simplified)								
اُردو	Urdu	English	Yes			Yes				
O‘zbek	Uzbek	English								
Tiếng Việt	Vietnamese	English	Yes			Yes				MUI
Wolof	Wolof	French								
IsiXhosa	Xhosa	English				Yes				
Èdè Yorùbá	Yoruba	English								
IsiZulu	Zulu	English				Yes				

=== Mobile ===
The multilingual user interface for Windows Phones did not appear until version 7.0.

Language packs for the new Windows Phone platform
Language	English name	7.0	7.5	7.7	7.8	8.0	8.0.2	8.1	8.1.2	10
Afrikaans	Afrikaans	No	No	No	No	No	No	Yes	Yes	Yes
አማርኛ	Amharic	No	No	No	No	No	No	No	No	Yes
العربية	Arabic	No	No	No	No	Yes	Yes	Yes	Yes	Yes
Azərbaycan	Azerbaijani	No	No	No	No	Yes	Yes	Yes	Yes	Yes
Беларуская	Belarusian	No	No	No	No	Yes	Yes	Yes	Yes	Yes
Български	Bulgarian	No	No	No	No	Yes	Yes	Yes	Yes	Yes
বাংলা	Bangla	No	No	No	No	No	No	No	Yes	Yes
Català	Catalan	No	No	No	No	Yes	Yes	Yes	Yes	Yes
Čeština	Czech	No	Yes	Yes	Yes	Yes	Yes	Yes	Yes	Yes
Dansk	Danish	No	Yes	Yes	Yes	Yes	Yes	Yes	Yes	Yes
Deutsch	German	Yes	Yes	Yes	Yes	Yes	Yes	Yes	Yes	Yes
Ελληνικά	Greek	No	Yes	Yes	Yes	Yes	Yes	Yes	Yes	Yes
English (United Kingdom)	English (United Kingdom)	Yes	Yes	Yes	Yes	Yes	Yes	Yes	Yes	Yes
English (United States)	English (United States)	Yes	Yes	Yes	Yes	Yes	Yes	Yes	Yes	Yes
Español (España)	Spanish (Spain)	Yes	Yes	Yes	Yes	Yes	Yes	Yes	Yes	Yes
Español (México)	Spanish (Mexico)	No	No	No	No	Yes	Yes	Yes	Yes	Yes
Eesti	Estonian	No	No	No	No	Yes	Yes	Yes	Yes	Yes
Euskara	Basque	No	No	No	No	No	No	Yes	Yes	Yes
فارسى	Persian	No	No	No	No	Yes	Yes	Yes	Yes	Yes
Suomi	Finnish	No	Yes	Yes	Yes	Yes	Yes	Yes	Yes	Yes
Filipino	Filipino	No	No	No	No	Yes	Yes	Yes	Yes	Yes
Français (Canada)	French (Canada)	No	No	No	No	No	Yes	Yes	Yes	Yes
Français (France)	French (France)	Yes	Yes	Yes	Yes	Yes	Yes	Yes	Yes	Yes
Galego	Galician	Yes	Yes	Yes	Yes	Yes	No	Yes	Yes	Yes
Hausa	Hausa	No	No	No	No	No	No	Yes	Yes	Yes
עברית	Hebrew	No	No	No	No	Yes	Yes	Yes	Yes	Yes
हिन्दी	Hindi	No	No	No	No	Yes	Yes	Yes	Yes	Yes
Hrvatski	Croatian	No	No	No	No	Yes	Yes	Yes	Yes	Yes
Magyar	Hungarian	No	Yes	Yes	Yes	Yes	Yes	Yes	Yes	Yes
Indonesia	Indonesian	No	No	Yes	Yes	Yes	Yes	Yes	Yes	Yes
Íslenska	Icelandic	No	No	No	No	No	No	No	No	Yes
Italiano	Italian	Yes	Yes	Yes	Yes	Yes	Yes	Yes	Yes	Yes
日本語	Japanese	No	Yes	Yes	Yes	Yes	Yes	Yes	Yes	Yes
Қазақ тілі	Kazakh	No	No	No	No	Yes	Yes	Yes	Yes	Yes
ខ្មែរ	Khmer	No	No	No	No	No	No	No	Yes	Yes
ಕನ್ನಡ	Kannada	No	No	No	No	No	No	No	No	Yes
한국어	Korean	No	Yes	Yes	Yes	Yes	Yes	Yes	Yes	Yes
ລາວ	Lao	No	No	No	No	No	No	No	Yes	Yes
Lietuvių	Lithuanian	No	No	No	No	Yes	Yes	Yes	Yes	Yes
Latviešu	Latvian	No	No	No	No	Yes	Yes	Yes	Yes	Yes
Македонски	Macedonian	No	No	No	No	Yes	Yes	Yes	Yes	Yes
മലയാളം	Malayalam	No	No	No	No	No	No	No	No	Yes
Melayu	Malay	No	No	Yes	Yes	Yes	Yes	Yes	Yes	Yes
Norsk bokmål	Norwegian Bokmål	No	Yes	Yes	Yes	Yes	Yes	Yes	Yes	Yes
Nederlands	Dutch	No	Yes	Yes	Yes	Yes	Yes	Yes	Yes	Yes
Polski	Polish	No	Yes	Yes	Yes	Yes	Yes	Yes	Yes	Yes
Português (Brasil)	Portuguese (Brazil)	No	Yes	Yes	Yes	Yes	Yes	Yes	Yes	Yes
Português (Portugal)	Portuguese (Portugal)	No	Yes	Yes	Yes	Yes	Yes	Yes	Yes	Yes
Română	Romanian	No	No	No	No	Yes	Yes	Yes	Yes	Yes
Русский	Russian	No	Yes	Yes	Yes	Yes	Yes	Yes	Yes	Yes
Slovenčina	Slovak	No	No	No	No	Yes	Yes	Yes	Yes	Yes
Slovenščina	Slovenian	No	No	No	No	Yes	Yes	Yes	Yes	Yes
Shqip	Albanian	No	No	No	No	Yes	Yes	Yes	Yes	Yes
Srpski	Serbian	No	No	No	No	Yes	Yes	Yes	Yes	Yes
Svenska	Swedish	No	Yes	Yes	Yes	Yes	Yes	Yes	Yes	Yes
Kiswahili	Swahili	No	No	No	No	No	No	No	Yes	Yes
தமிழ்	Tamil	No	No	No	No	No	No	No	No	Yes
తెలుగు	Telugu	No	No	No	No	No	No	No	No	Yes
ไทย	Thai	No	No	No	No	Yes	Yes	Yes	Yes	Yes
Türkçe	Turkish	No	No	No	No	Yes	Yes	Yes	Yes	Yes
Українська	Ukrainian	No	No	No	No	Yes	Yes	Yes	Yes	Yes
O‘zbek	Uzbek	No	No	No	No	Yes	Yes	Yes	Yes	Yes
Tiếng Việt	Vietnamese	No	No	No	No	Yes	Yes	Yes	Yes	Yes
中文 (简体)	Chinese (Simplified)	No	Yes	Yes	Yes	Yes	Yes	Yes	Yes	Yes
中文 (香港特別行政區)	Chinese (Hong Kong)	No	No	No	No	No	No	Yes	Yes	Yes
中文 (繁體)	Chinese (Traditional)	No	Yes	Yes	Yes	Yes	Yes	Yes	Yes	Yes

== Patent ==
The MUI technology is covered by an international patent titled "Multilingual User Interface for an Operating System". The inventors are Bjorn C. Rettig, Edward S. Miller, Gregory Wilson, and Shan Xu.

== See also ==
- Windows MUI Knowledge Center (archived)
- Windows Language Packs (Microsoft reference)
- Language Interface Pack (LIP)
- GNU gettext: both a UNIX system for localization and a function similar to LoadString
