= Computer maintenance =

Keeping computers in a good condition

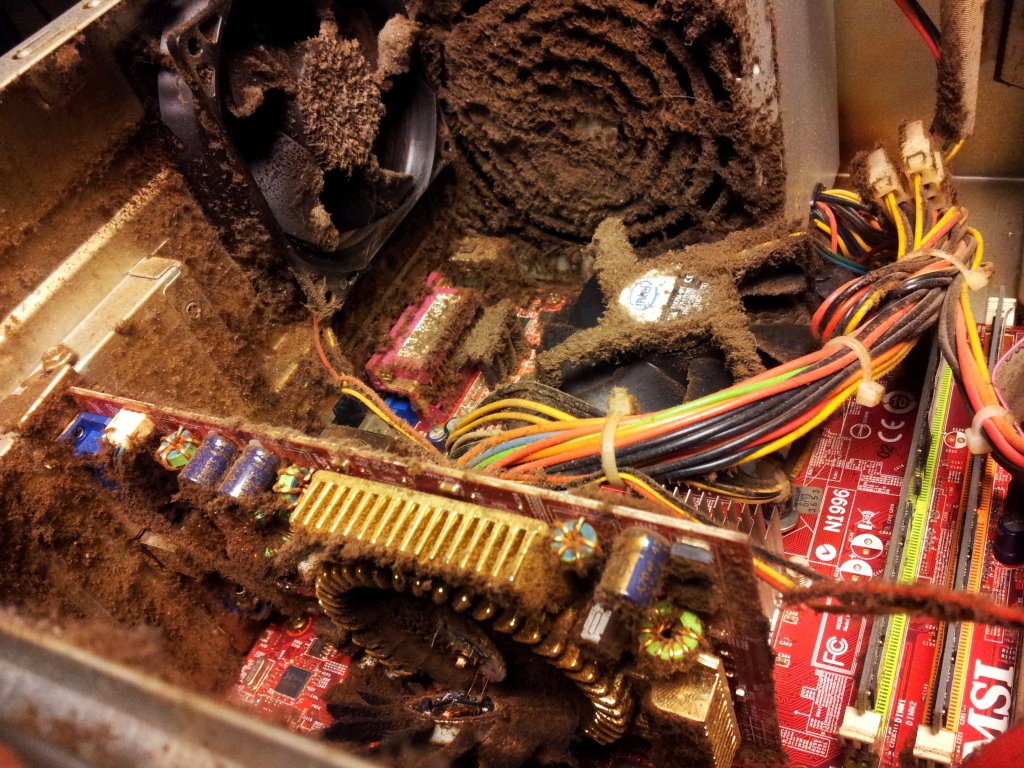
Dusty-dirty PC

Computer maintenance is the practice of keeping computers in a good state of repair. A computer containing accumulated dust and debris may not run properly.

== PC Components ==
=== Keyboard ===
The crumbs, dust, and other particulate that fall between the keys and build up underneath are loosened by spraying pressurized air into the keyboard, then removed with a low-pressure vacuum cleaner. A plastic-cleaning agent applied to the surface of the keys with a cloth is used to remove the accumulation of oil and dirt from repeated contact with a user's fingertips. If this is not sufficient for a more severely dirty keyboard, keys are physically removed for more focused individual cleaning, or for better access to the area beneath. Finally, the surface is wiped with a disinfectant.

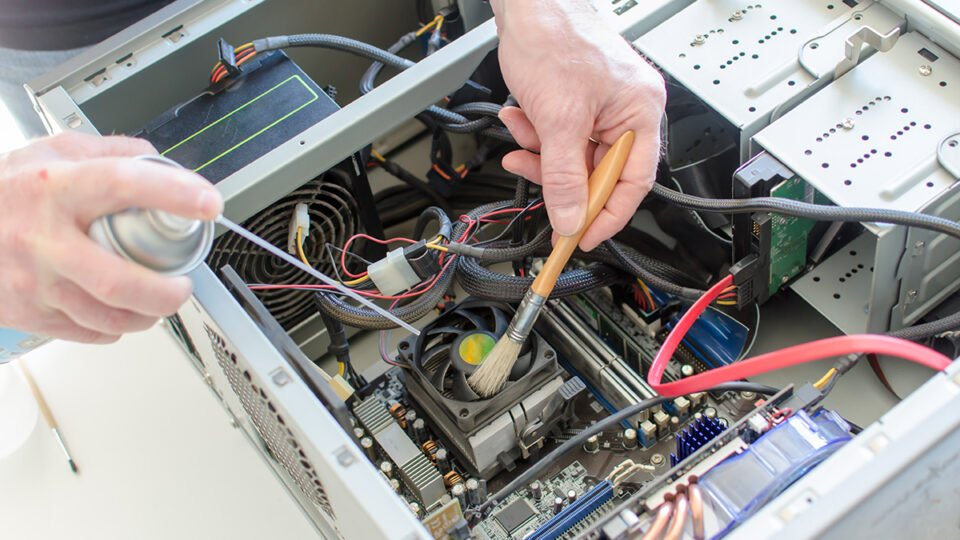
Pc maintenance

=== Monitor ===
A monitor displays information in visual form, using text and graphics. The portion of the monitor that displays the information is called the screen. Like a television screen, a computer screen can show still or moving pictures and It's a part of Output Devices.

=== Mouse ===
The top surface of the mouse is wiped with a plastic cleanser to remove the dirt that accumulates from contact with the hand, as on the keyboard. The bottom surface is also cleaned to ensure that it can slide freely. If it is a mechanical mouse, the trackball is taken out, not only to clean the ball itself, but to scrape dirt from the runners that sense the ball's movement and can become jittery or stuck if impeded by grime.

=== Tower/desktop unit ===
Internal components accumulate dust brought in by the airflow maintained by fans to keep the PC from overheating. A soft brush may remove loose dirt; the remainder is dislodged with compressed air and removed with a low-pressure vacuum. The case is wiped down with a cleaning agent. A pressurized blower or gas duster can remove dust that cannot be reached with a brush.

=== Laptop ===
Laptops combine several computer components into one portable device including a screen, keyboard, touchpad, and internal hardware. The screen, keyboard, and touchpad can be cleaned with a soft microfiber cloth. Dust can also build up around ventilation openings, restricting airflow and causing overheating. Using laptops on soft surfaces, such as beds or couches, can block these openings. Laptop screens and hinges can be damaged by excessive pressure or improper handling. Padded carrying cases can help protect from damage during transportation.

== Data care ==
=== Backing up ===
Important data stored on computers may be copied and archived securely so that, in the event of failure, the data and systems may be reconstructed. When major maintenance such as patching is performed, a backup is recommended as the first step in case the update fails and reversion is required.

Disk cleanup may be performed as regular maintenance to remove these. Files may become fragmented and so slow the performance of the computer. Disk defragmentation may be performed to combine these fragments and so improve performance.

=== Legal issues ===
In the US, the Digital Millennium Copyright Act specifically exempts computer-maintenance activities, so copies of copyright files may be made in the course of maintenance provided that they are destroyed afterwards.

== Software ==
=== Operating system ===
Operating-system files such as the Windows registry may require maintenance. A utility such as a registry cleaner may be used for this. Also inbuilt Disk defragmenter will also help.

=== Software updates ===
Software packages and operating systems may require regular updates to correct software bugs and to address security weaknesses.

== Security ==
Maintaining security involves vulnerability management and installation and proper operation of antivirus software like Kaspersky, Avast Antivirus, McAfee and Many are available.
