= Find (Windows) =

Shell command that finds text in files

find
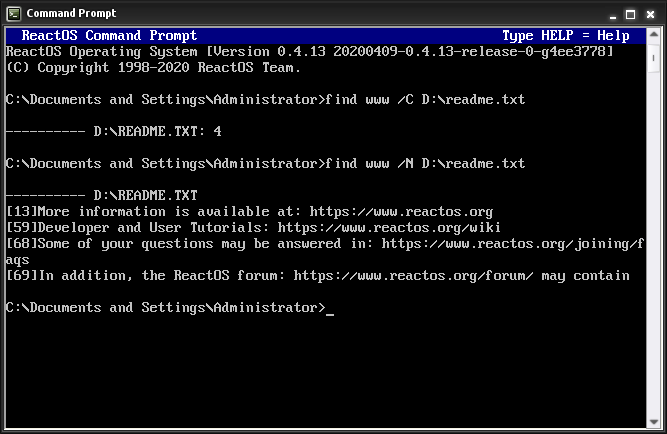
- The ReactOS find command
- Developers: Microsoft, IBM, DR, Datalight, Novell, Jim Hall, ReactOS Contributors
- Release: March 1983; 43 years ago
- Written in: MS-DOS: x86 assembly language FreeDOS, ReactOS: C
- Operating system: MS-DOS, PC DOS, FlexOS, SISNE plus, DR DOS, ROM-DOS, FreeDOS, 4690 OS, Windows, OS/2, eComStation, ArcaOS, ReactOS
- Platform: Cross-platform
- Type: Command
- License: MS-DOS: MIT; FreeDOS, ReactOS: GPLv2+
- Repository: github.com/microsoft/MS-DOS/blob/main/v2.0/source/FIND.ASM

find is a shell command that searches for text in files and prints matching lines to standard output.

The command is available in DOS, Digital Research FlexOS, IBM/Toshiba 4690 OS, IBM OS/2, Windows, and ReactOS. On MS-DOS, the command is available in versions 2 and later. DR DOS 6.0 and Datalight ROM-DOS include an implementation of the find command. The FreeDOS version was developed by Jim Hall and is licensed under the GPL.

Notably, the same-named Unix-based command performs an entirely different function – searching the file system for matching files. This functionality is provided by the forfiles command in an environment with the command of this article. The Unix-based grep command provides a function similar to the command of this article.

== Use ==
The command syntax can be described as:

find [/v] [/c] [/n] [/i] "TEXT" [PATH...]

"TEXT"
Text to find. Must be enclosed in quotes. Notably, matching does not support wildcard characters.

PATH
File system path to a file. If none specified, the command searches the text from standard input.

/v
Display lines not containing the text.

/c
Display only the count of matching lines.

/n
Display line numbers with matching lines.

/i
Ignore the case of characters when searching.

== Examples ==
The following command searches file "Foo" for lines that contain "Important" and prints results to standard output.

C:\>find "Important" Foo

== See also ==
- List of DOS commands
- Regular expression – Sequence of characters that forms a search pattern
