= DOS API =

API of the MS-DOS operating system

The DOS API is an API which originated with 86-DOS and is used in MS-DOS/PC DOS and other DOS-compatible operating systems. Most calls to the DOS API are invoked using software interrupt 21h (INT 21h). By calling INT 21h with a subfunction number in the AH processor register and other parameters in other registers, various DOS services can be invoked. These include handling keyboard input, video output, disk file access, program execution, memory allocation, and various other activities. In the late 1980s, DOS extenders along with the DOS Protected Mode Interface (DPMI) allow the programs to run in either 16-bit or 32-bit protected mode and still have access to the DOS API.

== History of the DOS API ==
The original DOS API in 86-DOS and MS-DOS 1.0 was designed to be functionally compatible with CP/M. Files were accessed using file control blocks (FCBs). The DOS API was greatly extended in MS-DOS 2.0 with several Unix concepts, including file access using file handles, hierarchical directories and device I/O control. In DOS 3.1, network redirector support was added. In MS-DOS 3.31, the INT 25h/26h functions were enhanced to support hard disks greater than 32 MB. MS-DOS 5 added support for using upper memory blocks (UMBs). After MS-DOS 5, the DOS API was unchanged for the successive standalone releases of DOS.

== The DOS API and Windows ==
In Windows 9x, DOS loaded the protected-mode system and graphical shell. DOS was usually accessed from a virtual DOS machine (VDM) but it was also possible to boot directly to real mode MS-DOS 7.0 without loading Windows. The DOS API was extended with enhanced internationalization support and long filename support, though the long filename support was only available in a VDM. With Windows 95 OSR2, DOS was updated to 7.1, which added FAT32 support, and functions were added to the DOS API to support this. Windows 98 and Windows Me also implement the MS-DOS 7.1 API, though Windows Me reports itself as MS-DOS 8.0.

Windows NT and the systems based on it (e.g. Windows XP and Windows Vista) are not based on MS-DOS, but use a virtual machine, NTVDM, to handle the DOS API. NTVDM works by running a DOS program in virtual 8086 mode (an emulation of real mode within protected mode available on 80386 and higher processors). NTVDM supports the DOS 5.0 API. DOSEMU for Linux uses a similar approach.

== Interrupt vectors used by DOS ==
The following is the list of interrupt vectors used by programs to invoke the DOS API functions.

Interrupt vector	Description	Version	Notes
20h	Terminate program	1.0+	Implemented in DOS kernel
21h	Main DOS API	1.0+	Implemented in DOS kernel
22h	Program terminate address	1.0+	Return address in calling program
23h	Control-C handler address	1.0+	Default handler is in the command shell (usually COMMAND.COM)
24h	Critical error handler address	1.0+	Default handler is in the command shell (usually COMMAND.COM)
25h	Absolute disk read	1.0+	Implemented in DOS kernel, enhanced in DOS 3.31 to support up to 2 GB partitions
26h	Absolute disk write	1.0+	Implemented in DOS kernel, enhanced in DOS 3.31 to support up to 2 GB partitions
27h	Terminate and stay resident	1.0+	Implemented in COMMAND.COM in DOS 1.0, DOS kernel in DOS 2.0+
28h	Idle callout	2.0+	Called by DOS kernel when waiting for input
29h	Fast console output	2.0+	Implemented by the built-in console device driver or a replacement driver like ANSI.SYS
2Ah	Networking and critical section	3.0+	Called by DOS kernel to interface with networking software
2Bh	Unused		
2Ch	Unused		
2Dh	Unused		
2Eh	Reload transient	2.0+	Implemented in COMMAND.COM
2Fh	Multiplex	3.0+	Implemented in DOS kernel and various programs (PRINT, MSCDEX, DOSKEY, APPEND, etc.) depending on subfunction number

== DOS INT 21h services ==
The following is the list of functions provided via the DOS API primary software interrupt vector.

AH	Description	Version
00h	Program terminate	1.0+
01h	Character input	1.0+
02h	Character output	1.0+
03h	Auxiliary input	1.0+
04h	Auxiliary output	1.0+
05h	Printer output	1.0+
06h	Direct console I/O	1.0+
07h	Direct console input without echo	1.0+
08h	Console input without echo	1.0+
09h	Display string	1.0+
0Ah	Buffered keyboard input	1.0+
0Bh	Get input status	1.0+
0Ch	Flush input buffer and input	1.0+
0Dh	Disk reset	1.0+
0Eh	Set default drive	1.0+
0Fh	Open file	1.0+
10h	Close file	1.0+
11h	Find first file	1.0+
12h	Find next file	1.0+
13h	Delete file	1.0+
14h	Sequential read	1.0+
15h	Sequential write	1.0+
16h	Create or truncate file	1.0+
17h	Rename file	1.0+
18h	Reserved	1.0+
19h	Get default drive	1.0+
1Ah	Set disk transfer address	1.0+
1Bh	Get allocation info for default drive	1.0+
1Ch	Get allocation info for specified drive	1.0+
1Dh	Reserved	1.0+
1Eh	Reserved	1.0+
1Fh	Get disk parameter block for default drive	1.0+
20h	Reserved	1.0+
21h	Random read	1.0+
22h	Random write	1.0+
23h	Get file size in records	1.0+
24h	Set random record number	1.0+
25h	Set interrupt vector	1.0+
26h	Create PSP	1.0+
27h	Random block read	1.0+
28h	Random block write	1.0+
29h	Parse filename	1.0+
2Ah	Get date	1.0+
2Bh	Set date	1.0+
2Ch	Get time	1.0+
2Dh	Set time	1.0+
2Eh	Set verify flag	1.0+
2Fh	Get disk transfer address	2.0+
30h	Get DOS version	2.0+
31h	Terminate and stay resident	2.0+
32h	Get disk parameter block for specified drive	2.0+
33h	Get or set Ctrl-Break	2.0+
34h	Get InDOS flag pointer	2.0+
35h	Get interrupt vector	2.0+
36h	Get free disk space	2.0+
37h	Get or set switch character	2.0+
38h	Get or set country info	2.0+
39h	Create subdirectory	2.0+
3Ah	Remove subdirectory	2.0+
3Bh	Change current directory	2.0+
3Ch	Create or truncate file	2.0+
3Dh	Open file	2.0+
3Eh	Close file	2.0+
3Fh	Read file or device	2.0+
40h	Write file or device	2.0+
41h	Delete file	2.0+
42h	Move file pointer	2.0+
43h	Get or set file attributes	2.0+
44h	I/O control for devices	2.0+
45h	Duplicate handle	2.0+
46h	Redirect handle	2.0+
47h	Get current directory	2.0+
48h	Allocate memory	2.0+
49h	Release memory	2.0+
4Ah	Reallocate memory	2.0+
4Bh	Execute program	2.0+
4Ch	Terminate with return code	2.0+
4Dh	Get program return code	2.0+
4Eh	Find first file	2.0+
4Fh	Find next file	2.0+
50h	Set current PSP	2.0+
51h	Get current PSP	2.0+
52h	Get DOS internal pointers (SYSVARS)	2.0+
53h	Create disk parameter block	2.0+
54h	Get verify flag	2.0+
55h	Create program PSP	2.0+
56h	Rename file	2.0+
57h	Get or set file date and time	2.0+
58h	Get or set allocation strategy	2.11+
59h	Get extended error info	3.0+
5Ah	Create unique file	3.0+
5Bh	Create new file	3.0+
5Ch	Lock or unlock file	3.0+
5Dh	File sharing functions	3.0+
5Eh	Network functions	3.0+
5Fh	Network redirection functions	3.0+
60h	Qualify filename	3.0+
61h	Reserved	3.0+
62h	Get current PSP	3.0+
63h	Get DBCS lead byte table pointer	3.0+
64h	Set wait for external event flag	3.2+
65h	Get extended country info	3.3+
66h	Get or set code page	3.3+
67h	Set handle count	3.3+
68h	Commit file	3.3+
69h	Get or set media id	4.0+
6Ah	Commit file	4.0+
6Bh	Reserved	4.0+
6Ch	Extended open/create file	4.0+

== Operating systems with native support ==
- MS-DOS – most widespread implementation
- PC DOS – IBM OEM version of MS-DOS
- OS/2 1.x – Microsoft/IBM successor to MS-DOS and PC DOS
- SISNE plus – Clone created by Itautec and Scopus Tecnologia in Brazil
- DR-DOS – Digital Research DOS family, including Novell DOS, PalmDOS, OpenDOS, etc.
- PTS-DOS – PhysTechSoft & Paragon DOS clone, including S/DOS
- ROM-DOS – Datalight ROM DOS version
- Embedded DOS – General Software version
- FreeDOS – Free, open source DOS clone
- ReactOS (IA-32 and x86-64 versions)
- Windows 95 – contains MS-DOS 7.0
- Windows 98 – contains MS-DOS 7.1
- Windows 98 SE – contains MS-DOS 7.1
- Windows ME – contains MS-DOS 8.0

== Operating systems with DOS emulation layer ==
- Concurrent CP/M-86 (3.1 only) with PCMODE – Digital Research CP/M-86-based OS with optional PC DOS emulator
- Concurrent DOS – Digital Research CDOS family with built-in PC DOS emulator
- DOS Plus – a stripped-down single-user variant of Concurrent PC DOS 4.1–5.0
- Multiuser DOS – Digital Research/Novell MDOS family including Datapac System Manager, IMS REAL/32, etc.
- OS/2 (2.x and later) – IBM operating system using a fully-licensed MS-DOS 5.0 in a virtual machine
- Windows NT (all versions except 64-bit editions and 32-bit ARM editions)

== Other emulators ==
- NTVDM for Windows NT
- DOSEMU for Linux
- DOSBox
- ReactOS

== See also ==
- BIOS interrupt call
- Ralf Brown's Interrupt List (RBIL)
- Comparison of DOS operating systems
- DOS Protected Mode Interface (DPMI)
- DOS extender
- DOS MZ executable
- COMMAND.COM
