= Comparison of MS-DOS compatible operating systems =

This article details versions of MS-DOS, IBM PC DOS, and at least partially compatible disk operating systems. It does not include the many other operating systems called "DOS" which are unrelated to IBM PC compatibles.

== Historical and licensing information ==
Originally MS-DOS was designed to be an operating system that could run on any computer with a 8086-family microprocessor. It competed with other operating systems written for such computers, such as CP/M-86 and UCSD Pascal. Each computer would have its own distinct hardware and its own version of MS-DOS, a situation similar to the one that existed for CP/M, with MS-DOS emulating the same solution as CP/M to adapt for different hardware platforms. So there were many different original equipment manufacturer (OEM) versions of MS-DOS for different hardware. But the greater speed attainable by direct control of hardware was of particular importance, especially when running computer games. So very soon an IBM-compatible architecture became the goal, and before long all 8086-family computers closely emulated IBM hardware, and only a single version of MS-DOS for a fixed hardware platform was all that was needed for the market. This specific version of MS-DOS is the version that is discussed here, as all other versions of MS-DOS died out with their respective systems. One version of such a generic MS-DOS (Z-DOS) is mentioned here, but there were dozens more. All these were for personal computers that used an 8086-family microprocessor, but which were not fully IBM PC compatible.

Name	First public release date	Creator	Owner or maintainer as of 2021	License
86-DOS 1.00	28 April 1981	Seattle Computer Products	Support ended	Open source, MIT License
PC DOS 1.0	12 August 1981	Microsoft (for IBM)	Support ended	Open source, MIT License
PC DOS 1.1	May 1982	Microsoft (for IBM)	Support ended	Proprietary
PC DOS 2.0	March 1983	Microsoft (for IBM)	Support ended	Proprietary
PC DOS 2.1	October 1983	Microsoft (for IBM)	Support ended	Proprietary
PC DOS 3.0	August 1984	Microsoft (for IBM)	Support ended	Proprietary
PC DOS 3.1	1985	Microsoft (for IBM)	Support ended	Proprietary
PC DOS 3.2	1986	Microsoft (for IBM)	Support ended	Proprietary
PC DOS 3.3	1987	Microsoft (for IBM)	Support ended	Proprietary
IBM DOS 4.0 (called PC DOS 4.0)	1988	Microsoft (for IBM)	Support ended	Proprietary
IBM DOS 5.0 (called PC DOS 5.0)	1991	Microsoft (for IBM)	Support ended	Proprietary
PC DOS 6.1, PC DOS 6.3	1993	IBM	Support ended	Proprietary
PC DOS 7.0 (revision 0)	1995	IBM	Support ended	Proprietary
PC DOS 2000 (PC DOS 7.0 revision 1)	1998	IBM	Support ended	Proprietary
PC DOS 7.10	2003	IBM	Support ended by IBM	Proprietary
MS-DOS 1.25 (first version named "MS-DOS")	1982	Microsoft	Support ended	Open source, MIT License
Z-DOS 1.25	May 1982	OEM Zenith Data Systems	Support ended	Proprietary
MS-DOS 2.0	March 1983	Microsoft	Support ended	Open source, MIT License
MS-DOS 2.11	December 1983	Microsoft	Support ended	Proprietary
MS-DOS 3.0	1984	Microsoft	Support ended	Proprietary
MS-DOS 3.1	1984	Microsoft	Support ended	Proprietary
MS-DOS 3.2	1986	Microsoft	Support ended	Proprietary
MS-DOS 3.3	1987	Microsoft	Support ended	Proprietary
MS-DOS 4.0	1988	Microsoft	Support ended	Open source, MIT License
MS-DOS 5.0	1991	Microsoft	Support ended	Proprietary
MS-DOS 6.0	1993	Microsoft	Support ended	Proprietary
MS-DOS 6.20	1993	Microsoft	Support ended	Proprietary
MS-DOS 6.21	March 1994	Microsoft	Support ended	Proprietary
MS-DOS 6.22	April 1994	Microsoft	Support ended	Proprietary
MS-DOS 7.0 (Windows 95A)	1995	Microsoft	Support ended	Proprietary
MS-DOS 7.10 (Windows 95 OSRs 2 and 2.5, 98, 98 SE)	1996	Microsoft	Support ended	Proprietary
MS-DOS 8.0 (Windows Me and later)	2000	Microsoft	Support ended by Microsoft	Proprietary
DOS Plus 1.1, 1.2/1.2a	1985	Digital Research	Support ended	Proprietary
DOS Plus 2.1	1986	Digital Research	Support ended	Proprietary
DR DOS 3.31-3.35	1988	Digital Research	Support ended	Proprietary
DR DOS 3.40-3.41	1989	Digital Research	Support ended	Proprietary
DR DOS 5.0	1990	Digital Research	Support ended	Proprietary
DR DOS 6.0	1991	Digital Research	Support ended	Proprietary
Novell DOS 7	1993	Novell	Support ended	Proprietary
Caldera OpenDOS 7.01	1997	Caldera, Inc.; Caldera UK, Ltd.	Support ended officially; a derivative, Enhanced DR-DOS, was maintained by Udo Kuhnt until 2011	Partial, free non-commercial use
Caldera DR-OpenDOS 7.02	1997	Caldera, Inc.; Caldera UK, Ltd.	Support ended	Partial, free non-commercial use
Caldera DR-DOS 7.02	1998	Caldera, Inc.; Caldera UK, Ltd.	Support ended	Proprietary
Caldera DR-DOS 7.03	1999, 1998 prereleased	Caldera Thin Clients, Inc.; Caldera UK, Ltd; Lineo, Inc.	DRDOS, Inc.	Proprietary
DR-DOS 8.0	2004	DeviceLogics	Support ended	Proprietary
DR-DOS 8.1	2005	DRDOS, Inc.	Support ended	Proprietary
FreeDOS 1.0	3 September 2006	Jim Hall, et al.	The FreeDOS Project	Open source, GPL
FreeDOS 1.1	2 January 2012	Jim Hall, et al.	The FreeDOS Project	Open source, GPL
FreeDOS 1.2	25 December 2016	Jim Hall, et al.	The FreeDOS Project	Open source, GPL
FreeDOS 1.3	14 December 2021	Jim Hall, et al.	The FreeDOS Project	Open source, GPL
PTS-DOS 6.4	1993	PhysTechSoft	PhysTechSoft	Proprietary
PTS-DOS 6.5	?	PhysTechSoft	PhysTechSoft	Proprietary
PTS-DOS 6.6	?	PhysTechSoft	PhysTechSoft	Proprietary
PTS-DOS 2000 (6.7)	?	PhysTechSoft	PhysTechSoft	Proprietary
PTS-DOS 32 (7.0)	?	PhysTechSoft	PhysTechSoft	Proprietary
PTS-DOS 6.51	ca. 1995	Paragon Technology Systems	Paragon Technology Systems	Proprietary
Paragon DOS 2000 Pro	?	Paragon Technology Systems	Paragon Technology Systems	Proprietary
ROM-DOS 6.22	?	Datalight	Datalight	Proprietary
ROM-DOS 7.1	?	Datalight	Datalight	Proprietary
Embedded DOS	?	General Software	General Software	Proprietary
DIP DOS 2.11	1989	DIP Research, Atari Corporation	Support ended	Proprietary
RxDOS 6.2	1999	Michael Podanoffsky	Support ended	Open source, GPL
RxDOS 7.20-7.24	2018	C. Masloch	C. Masloch	Open source, GPL
SISNE plus	?	Itautec, Scopus Tecnologia	Support ended	Proprietary

== Technical specifications ==
Name	Hard drive: partition size max	Native support: File systems	Native support: floppy capacities 3.5"	Native support: floppy capacities 5.25"	Native support: floppy capacities 8.0"	Integrated disk compression utility	Native support: long file names
86-DOS 1.00	—N/a	FAT12; (CP/M 2 through RDCPM)	—N/a	NorthStar 87.5 KB; Cromemco 90 KB	Cromemco/Tarbell 250.25 KB; Tarbell 616 KB; Tarbell 1232 KB	No	No
MS-DOS 1.25	—N/a	FAT12	—N/a	160 KB; 320 KB	250.25 KB	No	No
MS-DOS 2.0-2.11	16 MB (32 MB with third-party FORMAT)	FAT12	—N/a	160 KB; 180 KB; 320 KB; 360 KB	250.25 KB; 500.5 KB; 616 KB; 1232 KB	No	No
MS-DOS 3.0	32 MB	FAT12, FAT16	—N/a	160 KB; 180 KB; 320 KB; 360 KB; 1.2 MB	—N/a	No	No
MS-DOS 3.1	32 MB	FAT12, FAT16	—N/a	160 KB; 180 KB; 320 KB; 360 KB; 1.2 MB	—N/a	No	No
MS-DOS 3.2	32 MB	FAT12, FAT16	720 KB	160 KB; 180 KB; 320 KB; 360 KB; 1.2 MB	—N/a	No	No
MS-DOS 3.3	32 MB	FAT12, FAT16	720 KB; 1.44 MB	160 KB; 180 KB; 320 KB; 360 KB; 1.2 MB	—N/a	No	No
MS-DOS 3.31	512 MB	FAT12, FAT16, FAT16B	720 KB; 1.44 MB	160 KB; 180 KB; 320 KB; 360 KB; 1.2 MB	—N/a	No	No
MS-DOS 4.0	2 GB	FAT12, FAT16, FAT16B	720 KB; 1.44 MB	160 KB; 180 KB; 320 KB; 360 KB; 1.2 MB	—N/a	No	No
MS-DOS 5.0	2 GB	FAT12, FAT16, FAT16B	720 KB, 1.44 MB, 2.88 MB	160 KB; 180 KB; 320 KB; 360 KB; 1.2 MB	—N/a	No	No
MS-DOS 6.0	2 GB	FAT12, FAT16, FAT16B	720 KB; 1.44 MB, 2.88 MB	160 KB; 180 KB; 320 KB; 360 KB; 1.2 MB	—N/a	DoubleSpace	No
MS-DOS 6.20	2 GB	FAT12, FAT16, FAT16B	720 KB; 1.44 MB, 2.88 MB	160 KB; 180 KB; 320 KB; 360 KB; 1.2 MB	—N/a	DoubleSpace	No
MS-DOS 6.21	2 GB	FAT12, FAT16, FAT16B	720 KB; 1.44 MB, 2.88 MB	160 KB; 180 KB; 320 KB; 360 KB; 1.2 MB	—N/a	No	No
MS-DOS 6.22	2 GB	FAT12, FAT16, FAT16B	720 KB; 1.44 MB, 2.88 MB	160 KB; 180 KB; 320 KB; 360 KB; 1.2 MB	—N/a	DriveSpace	No
MS-DOS 7.0 (Windows 95A)	2 GB	FAT12, FAT16, FAT16B	720 KB; 1.44 MB, 2.88 MB	160 KB; 180 KB; 320 KB; 360 KB; 1.2 MB	—N/a	DriveSpace	No
MS-DOS 7.1 (Windows 95B/OSR2, Windows 95C/OSR2.5, Windows 98, and Windows 98SE)	124.55 GB with FAT32	FAT12, FAT16, FAT16B, FAT32	720 KB; 1.44 MB, 2.88 MB	160 KB; 180 KB; 320 KB; 360 KB; 1.2 MB	—N/a	DriveSpace for Windows 95, none for Windows 98	No
MS-DOS 8.0 (Windows Me and later Windows versions)	124.55 GB with FAT32	FAT12, FAT16, FAT16B, FAT32	720 KB; 1.44 MB, 2.88 MB	160 KB; 180 KB; 320 KB; 360 KB; 1.2 MB	—N/a	No	No
PC DOS 1.0	—N/a	FAT12	—N/a	160 KB	—N/a	No	No
PC DOS 1.1	—N/a	FAT12	—N/a	160 KB; 320 KB (double-sided)	—N/a	No	No
PC DOS 2.0-2.1	16 MB (32 MB with third-party FORMAT)	FAT12	—N/a	160 KB; 180 KB; 320 KB; 360 KB	—N/a	No	No
PC DOS 3.0	32 MB	FAT12, FAT16	—N/a	160 KB; 180 KB; 320 KB; 360 KB; 1.2 MB	—N/a	No	No
PC DOS 3.1	32 MB	FAT12, FAT16	—N/a	160 KB; 180 KB; 320 KB; 360 KB; 1.2 MB	—N/a	No	No
PC DOS 3.2	32 MB	FAT12, FAT16	720 KB	160 KB; 180 KB; 320 KB; 360 KB; 1.2 MB	—N/a	No	No
PC DOS 3.3	32 MB	FAT12, FAT16	720 KB; 1.44 MB	160 KB; 180 KB; 320 KB; 360 KB; 1.2 MB	—N/a	No	No
IBM DOS 4.0	2 GB	FAT12, FAT16, FAT16B	720 KB; 1.44 MB	160 KB; 180 KB; 320 KB; 360 KB; 1.2 MB	—N/a	No	No
IBM DOS 5.0	2 GB	FAT12, FAT16, FAT16B	720 KB, 1.44 MB, 2.88 MB	160 KB; 180 KB; 320 KB; 360 KB; 1.2 MB	—N/a	No	No
PC DOS 6.1 (early version)	2 GB	FAT12, FAT16, FAT16B	720 KB; 1.44 MB, 2.88 MB	160 KB; 180 KB; 320 KB; 360 KB; 1.2 MB	—N/a	No	No
PC DOS 6.1 with Compression / PC DOS 6.3	2 GB	FAT12, FAT16, FAT16B	720 KB; 1.44 MB, 2.88 MB	160 KB; 180 KB; 320 KB; 360 KB; 1.2 MB	—N/a	SuperStor	No
PC DOS 7.0 / PC DOS 2000	2 GB	FAT12, FAT16, FAT16B	720 KB; 1.44 MB, 1.86 MB (XDF), 2.88 MB	160 KB; 180 KB; 320 KB; 360 KB; 1.2 MB, 1.54 MB (XDF)	—N/a	Stacker	No
PC DOS 7.10	?	FAT12, FAT16, FAT16B, FAT32	720 KB; 1.44 MB, 1.86 MB (XDF), 2.88 MB	160 KB; 180 KB; 320 KB; 360 KB; 1.2 MB, 1.54 MB (XDF)	—N/a	Stacker, not on FAT32	No
DOS Plus 1.1	32 MB	FAT12, FAT16, CP/M-86	315 KB; 720 KB; CP/M 315 KB; CP/M 720 KB; MSX-DOS 360 KB; MSX-DOS 720 KB	160 KB; 180 KB; 320 KB; 360 KB; 800 KB; 1.2 MB; CP/M 160 KB; CP/M 320 KB	—N/a	No	No
DOS Plus 1.2-2.1	32 MB	FAT12, FAT16, CP/M-86	Apricot 315 KB; (720 KB)	160 KB; 180 KB; 320 KB; 360 KB; 1.2 MB; Acorn 640 KB; Acorn 800 KB; CP/M 320 KB	—N/a	No	No
DR DOS 3.31-3.35	2 GB	FAT12, FAT16, FAT16B	720 KB; 1.44 MB	160 KB; 180 KB; 320 KB; 360 KB; 1.2 MB	—N/a	No	No
DR DOS 3.40-3.41	2 GB	FAT12, FAT16, FAT16B	720 KB; 1.44 MB	160 KB; 180 KB; 320 KB; 360 KB; 1.2 MB	(250.25 KB)	No	No
DR DOS 5.0	2 GB	FAT12, FAT16, FAT16B	720 KB; 1.44 MB	160 KB; 180 KB; 320 KB; 360 KB; 1.2 MB	(250.25 KB)	No	No
DR DOS 6.0	2 GB	FAT12, FAT16, FAT16B	720 KB; 1.44 MB, 2.88 MB	160 KB; 180 KB; 320 KB; 360 KB; 1.2 MB	(250.25 KB)	SuperStor	No
PalmDOS 1.0	2 GB	FAT12, FAT16, FAT16B	720 KB; 1.44 MB, 2.88 MB	160 KB; 180 KB; 320 KB; 360 KB; 1.2 MB	(250.25 KB)	SuperStor	No
Novell DOS 7	2 GB	FAT12, FAT16, FAT16B	720 KB; 1.44 MB, 2.88 MB	160 KB; 180 KB; 320 KB; 360 KB; 1.2 MB	(250.25 KB)	Stacker	No
OpenDOS 7.01	2 GB	FAT12, FAT16, FAT16B	720 KB; 1.44 MB, 2.88 MB	160 KB; 180 KB; 320 KB; 360 KB; 1.2 MB	(250.25 KB)	Stacker	No
DR-OpenDOS 7.02	2 GB	FAT12, FAT16, FAT16B	720 KB; 1.44 MB, 2.88 MB	160 KB; 180 KB; 320 KB; 360 KB; 1.2 MB	(250.25 KB)	Stacker	No
DR-DOS 7.02	2 GB	FAT12, FAT16, FAT16B, (FAT32 in FDISK only)	720 KB; 1.44 MB, 2.88 MB	160 KB; 180 KB; 320 KB; 360 KB; 1.2 MB	(250.25 KB)	Stacker	Partial, COMMAND.COM and LONGNAME only
DR-DOS 7.03	2 GB	FAT12, FAT16, FAT16B, (FAT32 in FDISK only)	720 KB; 1.44 MB, 2.88 MB	160 KB; 180 KB; 320 KB; 360 KB; 1.2 MB	(250.25 KB)	Stacker	Partial, COMMAND.COM and LONGNAME only
DR-DOS 7.04-7.05	?	FAT12, FAT16, FAT16B, FAT32 (non-bootable)	720 KB; 1.44 MB, 2.88 MB	160 KB; 180 KB; 320 KB; 360 KB; 1.2 MB	(250.25 KB)	Stacker, not on FAT32	Partial, COMMAND.COM and LONGNAME only
DR-DOS 7.06-7.07	?	FAT12, FAT16, FAT16B, FAT32 (bootable)	720 KB; 1.44 MB, 2.88 MB	160 KB; 180 KB; 320 KB; 360 KB; 1.2 MB	(250.25 KB)	Stacker, not on FAT32	Partial, COMMAND.COM and LONGNAME only
DR-DOS 8.0	?	FAT12, FAT16, FAT16B, FAT32	720 KB; 1.44 MB, 2.88 MB	160 KB; 180 KB; 320 KB; 360 KB; 1.2 MB	(250.25 KB)	Supported, not on FAT32	Partial, COMMAND.COM only
DR-DOS 8.1	?	FAT12, FAT16, FAT16B, FAT32	720 KB; 1.44 MB, 2.88 MB	360 KB; 1.2 MB	—N/a	No	No
FreeDOS 1.0	2 TB	FAT12, FAT16, FAT16B, FAT32	720 KB; 1.44 MB, 2.88 MB	360 KB; 1.2 MB	—N/a	?	No
FreeDOS 1.1-1.3	2 TB	FAT12, FAT16, FAT16B, FAT32	720 KB; 1.44 MB, 2.88 MB	360 KB; 1.2 MB	—N/a	No	Yes
PTS-DOS 32	?	FAT12, FAT16, FAT16B, FAT32	720 KB; 1.44 MB, 2.88 MB	360 KB; 1.2 MB	—N/a	No	No
PTS-DOS 2000	?	FAT12, FAT16, FAT16B, FAT32	720 KB; 1.44 MB, 2.88 MB	360 KB; 1.2 MB	—N/a	No	No
PTS-DOS 2000 PRO	?	FAT12, FAT16, FAT16B, FAT32	720 KB; 1.44 MB, 2.88 MB	360 KB; 1.2 MB	—N/a	No	No
Datalight ROM-DOS	?	FAT12, FAT16, FAT16B, FAT32	720 KB; 1.44 MB, 2.88 MB	360 KB; 1.2 MB	—N/a	No	Yes
DIP DOS	—N/a	FAT12	—N/a	—N/a	—N/a	No	No

== See also ==
- Timeline of DOS operating systems
- OS/2
- List of operating systems
- Comparison of Linux distributions
- Comparison of operating systems
