= ROM DOS =

ROM DOS may refer to:

- Datalight ROM-DOS, a ROMed version of DOS by Datalight since 1989
- General Software Embedded DOS-ROM, a ROMed version of Embedded DOS by General Software since 1990
- MS-ROMDOS, a ROMed version of MS-DOS by Microsoft

== See also ==
- ROM Operating System (ROS), a ROMed version of Digital Research's DR DOS since 1988
- DOS Plus, a ROMable DOS
- DR DOS, a ROMable DOS
- PalmDOS, a ROMable DOS
