= Replace (command) =

replace
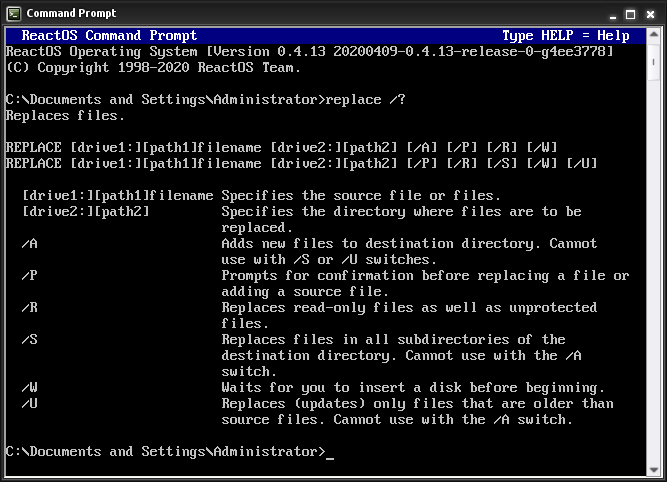
- The ReactOS replace command
- Developer(s): Microsoft, IBM, Digital Research, Paragon Technology, Rene Ableidinger, ReactOS Contributors
- Initial release: 1986, 38–39 years ago
- Operating system: MS-DOS, PC DOS, SISNE plus, OS/2, eComStation, ArcaOS, Windows, DR DOS, PTS-DOS, FreeDOS, ReactOS
- Platform: Cross-platform
- Type: Command
- License: MS-DOS, PC DOS, SISNE plus, OS/2, Windows, DR DOS, PTS-DOS: Proprietary commercial software FreeDOS, ReactOS: GPLv2
- Website: docs.microsoft.com/en-us/windows-server/administration/windows-commands/replace

In computing, replace is a command that is used to replace one or more existing computer files or add new files to a target directory. Files with a hidden or system attribute set cannot be replaced using replace. The command lists all files that are replaced.

== History ==
The replace command first appeared in MS-DOS 3.2 and has been included in most versions of MS-DOS and compatibles such as FreeDOS and PTS-DOS. DR DOS 6.0 includes an implementation of the replace command. The FreeDOS version was developed by Rene Ableidinger and is licensed under the GPL. It is also included as a console command in IBM OS/2, Microsoft Windows, and ReactOS. The ReactOS version was developed by Samuel Erdtman and is licensed under the GPL.

== Example ==
The following command updates the files in C:\delivery\ with the .exe files from C:\source\

C:\>replace "C:\source\*.exe" C:\delivery

== See also ==
- List of DOS commands
- List of Unix commands
