= Vol (command) =

vol
- The Windows XP vol command
- Developers: DR, Microsoft, IBM, Toshiba, ReactOS Contributors
- Initial release: March 1983; 42 years ago
- Operating system: MS-DOS, PC DOS, MSX-DOS, FlexOS, SISNE plus, OS/2, eComStation, ArcaOS, DR DOS, ROM-DOS, 4690 OS, PTS-DOS, Windows, FreeDOS, ReactOS
- Platform: Cross-platform
- Type: Command

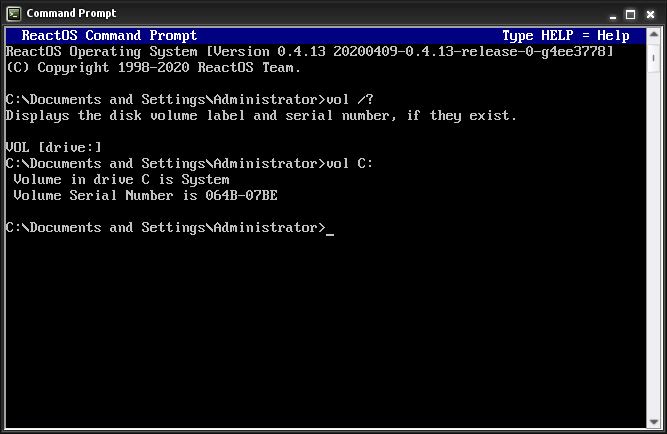
The ReactOS vol command

vol is a shell command that reports identifying information about an accessible volume (a.k.a. logical drive) including its label and serial number.

The command is available in shells COMMAND.COM and cmd.exe. It is available in various operating systems including versions of DOS, FlexOS, 4690 OS, OS/2, Windows, ReactOS, PTS-DOS 2000 Pro, and EFI shell. In MS-DOS, it is available in versions 2 and later.

The dir command also displays the volume label and serial number (if any).

== Use ==
The command reports information about the volume associated with the working directory by default. If a drive letter is specified, then the command reports information about its associated volume. On Windows, the volume serial number is displayed only for disks formatted with MS-DOS version 4.0 or later. OS/2 allows the user to specify more than one drive.

== Examples ==
In OS/2, the command line vol C: reports the label as "OS/2" and the serial number as "0815:1611" like:

The volume label in drive C is OS/2.
The Volume Serial Number is 0815:1611.

In Windows, the command line vol C: reports the label as "Windows" and the serial number as "080F-100B" like:

Volume in drive C is Windows
Volume Serial Number is 080F-100B

If drive C: had no label, "has no label" would have shown instead of "is Windows".

== Supported file systems ==
- FAT12
- FAT16
- FAT32
- exFAT
- NTFS

== See also ==
- Label (command) — Used to create, change and delete the disk volume label.
- List of DOS commands
