= Diskcomp =

diskcomp
- Developers: Microsoft, IBM, DR, Datalight, Novell, Toshiba, Michal Meller
- Release: 1981, 44–45 years ago
- Operating system: MS-DOS, PC DOS, FlexOS, DR DOS, ROM-DOS, 4690 OS, SISNE plus, OS/2, eComStation, ArcaOS, Windows, FreeDOS
- Platform: Cross-platform
- Type: Command
- Website: docs.microsoft.com/en-us/windows-server/administration/windows-commands/diskcomp

In computing, diskcomp is a command used for comparing the complete contents of a floppy disk to another one.

== Overview ==
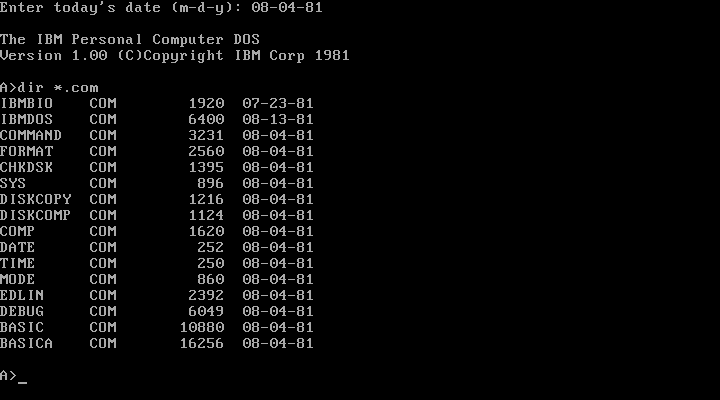
DISKCOMP.COM (among other commands) in IBM PC DOS 1.0.

The command is used on DOS, Digital Research FlexOS, IBM/Toshiba 4690 OS, SISNE plus, IBM OS/2 and Microsoft Windows. It is available in MS-DOS versions 3.2 and later and IBM PC DOS releases 1 and later. Digital Research DR DOS 6.0 and Datalight ROM-DOS also include an implementation of the diskcomp command. The FreeDOS version was developed by Michal Meller.

The diskcomp command does not work with hard disk drives, CDs, network drives, Zip drives, or USB flash drives, etc. It also does not allow comparison from 3.5 inch drive to 5.25 inch drives, and vice versa. The source and target drive must be the same size.

== Examples ==
Compare floppy disks in drive A: and drive B:

diskcomp a: b:

If the computer has only one floppy disk drive (in this case drive A:), it is still possible to compare two disks:

diskcomp a: a:

The diskcomp command will prompt to insert each disk, as needed.

The software outputs "Compare OK" if no differences are found, and "Compare error on side [number], track [number]" upon detecting a difference.
