= Choice (command) =

choice
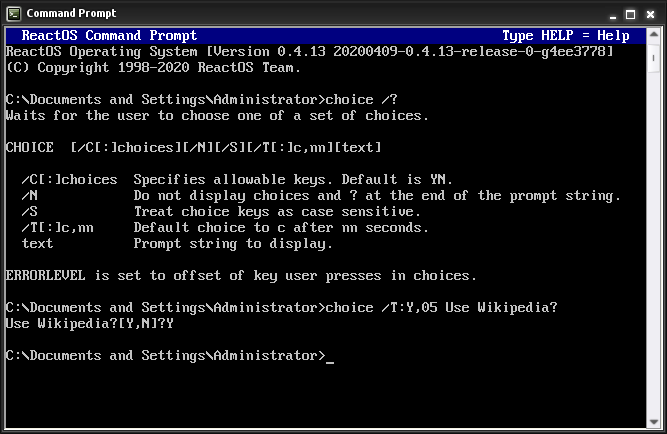
- The ReactOS choice command
- Developer(s): Microsoft, Novell, Datalight, Jim Hall, ReactOS Contributors
- Initial release: 1993, 31–32 years ago
- Operating system: DOS, Windows, ReactOS
- Platform: Cross-platform
- Type: Command
- License: MS-DOS, PC DOS, DR-DOS, Windows, PTS-DOS: Proprietary commercial software FreeDOS, ReactOS: GPL v2
- Website: docs.microsoft.com/en-us/windows-server/administration/windows-commands/choice

In computing, choice is a command that allows for batch files to prompt the user to select one item from a set of single-character choices. It is available in a number of operating system command-line shells.

== History ==
The command was first introduced as an external command (with filenames CHOICE.COM or CHOICE.EXE) with MS-DOS 6.0. It is included in Novell DOS 7 and IBM PC DOS 7.0, and is also available from the command-line shell of some versions of Microsoft Windows, but not under Windows 2000 and Windows XP. It was first made available for Windows in the Windows XP Resource Kit. It has been reintroduced in Windows Server 2003 and is present in later versions.

Starting with Windows 2000, the SET command has similar functionality using the /P command-line argument. However this command requires an additional key stroke (hitting ENTER key), which is not required by choice.

The choice command has been ported to OS/2, Rexx and Perl. It is also available in Datalight ROM-DOS, FreeDOS, PTS-DOS, and ReactOS. The FreeDOS version was developed by Jim Hall and is licensed under the GPL v2.

== Usage ==
The command returns the selected choice as an exit code which is set to the index of the key that the user selects from the list of choices. The first choice in the list returns a value of 1, the second a value of 2, and so forth. If a key is pressed that is not a valid choice, the command will sound a warning beep. If an error condition is detected, an exit code value of 255 will be returned. An exit code value of 0 will be returned if the user presses CTRL+BREAK or CTRL+C. Choice displays the default choices Y and N if used without parameters.

== Syntax ==
=== DOS ===
CHOICE [/C[:]choices] [/N] [/S] [/T[:]c,nn] ["text"]

Arguments:

- /C[:]choices Specifies allowable keys. The default is "YN".
- /T[:]c,nn This defaults choice to "c" after "nn" seconds.
- text Specifies the prompt string to display. (Quotes are optional).

Flags:

- /N Specifies not to display the choices and "?" at end of prompt string.
- /S Specifies that choice keys should be treated as case sensitive.

=== Microsoft Windows, ReactOS ===
CHOICE [/C [<Choice1><Choice2><…>]] [/N] [/CS] [/T <Timeout> /D <Choice>] [/M <"Text">]

Arguments:

- /C[:]choices Specifies allowable keys. The default is "YN". (Microsoft Windows restricts valid choice keys to a-z, A-Z, 0-9 and ASCII values of 128 to 254)
- /T[:]nn This defaults choice to /D after "nn" seconds. Must be specified with default /D.
- /D[:]c This defaults choice to 'c'.
- /M text Specifies the prompt string to display.

Flags:

- /N Specifies not to display the choices and "?" at end of prompt string.
- /CS Specifies that choice keys should be treated as case sensitive.

== Example ==
The batch file below gives the user three choices. The user is directed depending upon his input by evaluating the exit code using the IF ERRORLEVEL command (which tests on "greater or equal"). The selected choice is then printed to the screen using the ECHO command.

@ECHO OFF
@CHOICE /C:XYZ
IF ERRORLEVEL 3 GOTO Zpressed
IF ERRORLEVEL 2 GOTO Ypressed
IF ERRORLEVEL 1 GOTO Xpressed
GOTO end
:Xpressed
ECHO You have pressed "X"!
GOTO end
:Ypressed
ECHO You have pressed "Y"!
GOTO end
:Zpressed
ECHO You have pressed "Z"!
:end
@PAUSE

Note that the example uses the DOS syntax. This example requires slight adjustments before it applies directly to Windows versions of the CHOICE command.
Note that the IF command, when checking the ERRORLEVEL, compares the number and matches if ERRORLEVEL is equal to or higher than that number. Because of this IF ERRORLEVEL comparisons should be done in decrementing order.
Note that if the user presses Control-C to escape CHOICE followed by N then the program will continue. The first "Goto end" is needed.

== See also ==
- List of DOS commands
- select in bash
