= PTS-DOS =

Computer operating system for x86 processors

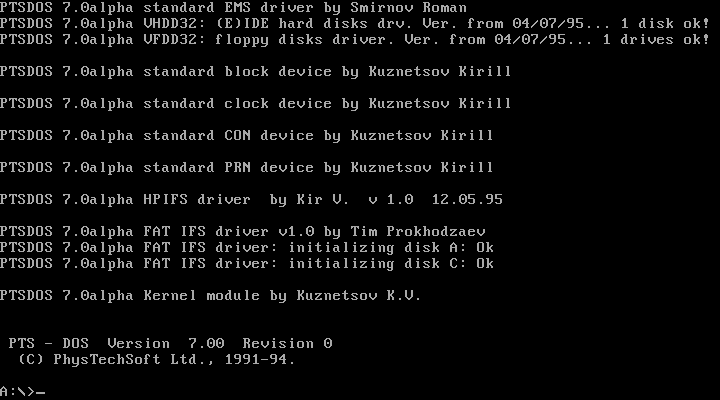
- PTS-DOS 7.0 beta version screenshot
- Developer: PhysTechSoft; Paragon Technology Systems
- OS family: DOS
- Working state: Current
- Source model: Closed source
- Initial release: 1993; 33 years ago
- Latest release: PTS-DOS 32
- Supported platforms: x86
- Kernel type: Monolithic kernel
- Influenced by: MS-DOS
- Default user interface: Command-line interface (COMMAND.COM)
- License: Proprietary
- Official website: phystechsoft.ru/pts-dos

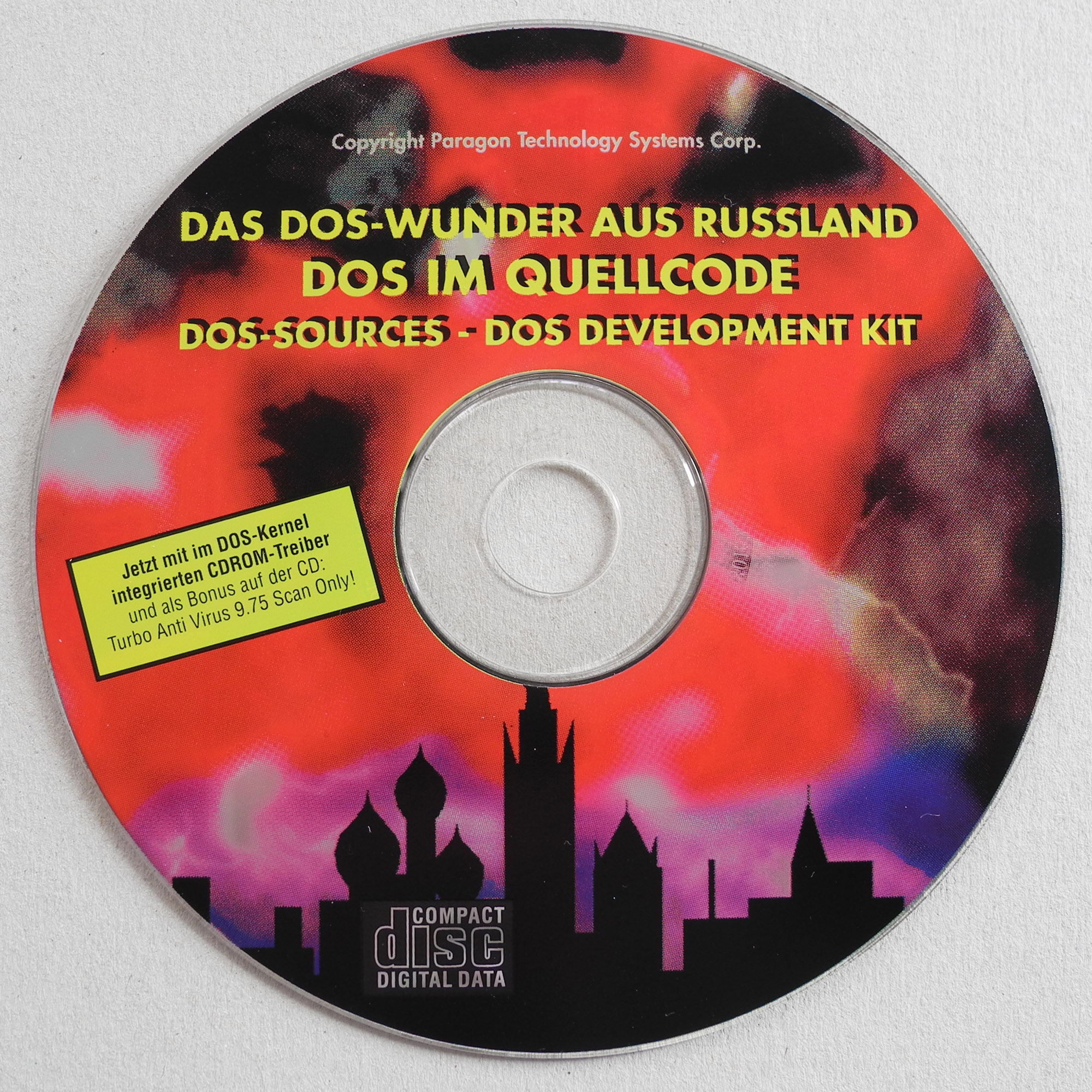
Paragon Technology Systems PTS/DOS 6.51CD & S/DOS 1.0

PTS-DOS (also punctuated as PTS/DOS) is clone of Microsoft's disk operating system, MS-DOS, developed in Russia by PhysTechSoft and Paragon Technology Systems. It was initially released in 1993.

== History and versions ==
PhysTechSoft was formed in 1991 in Moscow, Russia by graduates and members of MIPT, informally known as PhysTech. At the end of 1993, PhysTechSoft released the first commercially available PTS-DOS as PTS-DOS v6.4. The version numbering followed MS-DOS version numbers, as Microsoft released MS-DOS 6.2 in November 1993.

In 1995, some programmers left PhysTechSoft and founded Paragon Technology Systems. They took source code with them and released their own version named PTS/DOS 6.51CD as well as S/DOS 1.0 ("Source DOS"), a stripped down open-source version. According to official PhysTechSoft announcements, these programmers violated both copyright laws and Russian military laws, as PTS-DOS was developed in close relationship with Russia's military and thus may be subject to military secrets law.

PhysTechSoft continued development on their own and released PTS-DOS v6.6 somewhere between and presented PTS-DOS v6.65 at the CeBIT exhibition in 1997. The next version from PhysTechSoft, formally PTS/DOS Extended Version 6.70 was labeled PTS-DOS 2000 and is still being distributed as a last 16-bit PTS-DOS system, as of 2007.

Paragon continued their PTS-DOS line and released Paragon DOS Pro 2000 (also known and labeled in some places as PTS/DOS Pro 2000). According to Paragon, this was the last version and all development since then ceased. Moreover, this release contained bundled source code of older PTS-DOS v6.51.

Later, PhysTechSoft continued developing PTS-DOS and finally released PTS-DOS 32, formally known as PTS-DOS v7.0, which added support for the FAT32 file system.

PTS-DOS is certified by the Russian Ministry of Defense.

== Commands ==
The following list of commands are supported by PTS-DOS 2000 Pro.

- APPEND
- ASK
- ASSIGN
- ATTR
- BEEP
- BREAK
- CALL
- CD
- CHDIR
- CHKDSK
- CHOICE
- CLS
- COMMAND
- COPY
- CTTY
- DATE
- DEBUG
- DEL
- DIR
- DISKCOPY
- DISP
- ECHO
- ECHONLF
- ERASE
- EXE2BIN
- EXIT
- FDISK
- FIND
- FOR
- FORMAT
- GOTO
- HISTORY
- IF
- JOIN
- KEYB
- LABEL
- LOADFIX
- MD
- MEM
- MKDIR
- MKZOMBIE
- MODE
- MORE
- NLSFUNC
- PATH
- PAUSE
- PRINT
- PROMPT
- RD
- RDZOMBIE
- REM
- REN
- RENAME
- REPLACE
- RMDIR
- SET
- SETDRV
- SETVER
- SHARE
- SHIFT
- SORT
- SUBST
- SYS
- TIME
- TREE
- TYPE
- UNINSTALL
- VER
- VERIFY
- VOL

=== Exclusive commands ===
==== UNINSTALL ====
This command is specific to PTS/DOS 2000. Paragon's description is (quote)

- Purpose: Restores the booting of a system installed before PTS-DOS on the disk and restores its the boot sector.
- Syntax: UNINSTALL filename [drive:]

== Hardware requirements ==
- Intel 80286 CPU or better
- 512 KB RAM or more

== See also ==
- Comparison of DOS operating systems
- АДОС, unrelated to Russian MS-DOS
- Russian MS-DOS
