= Label (command) =

label
- Developers: Microsoft, IBM, Digital Research, Novell, Joe Cosentino, ReactOS Contributors
- Initial release: August 1984; 41 years ago
- Operating system: MS-DOS, PC DOS, SISNE plus, OS/2, eComStation, ArcaOS, Windows, DR DOS, ROM-DOS, PTS-DOS, FreeDOS, ReactOS
- Platform: Cross-platform
- Type: Command
- License: MS-DOS, PC DOS, Windows, OS/2: Proprietary commercial software FreeDOS, ReactOS: GNU General Public License
- Website: docs.microsoft.com/en-us/windows-server/administration/windows-commands/label

label is a shell command for setting the label of a volume (a.k.a. logical drive).

The command is supported for most variants of the FAT file system and for NTFS. It is available in various operating systems such as DOS, OS/2, Windows, ReactOS, DR DOS 6.0, and FreeDOS. It is available in MS-DOS versions 3.1 and later and IBM PC DOS releases 3 and later.

In modern versions of Windows, changing the label requires elevated permissions.

The current label is reported by both the dir and vol commands.

In Unix-like systems, various commands set a storage label. For instance, the command e2label is for an ext2 partition.

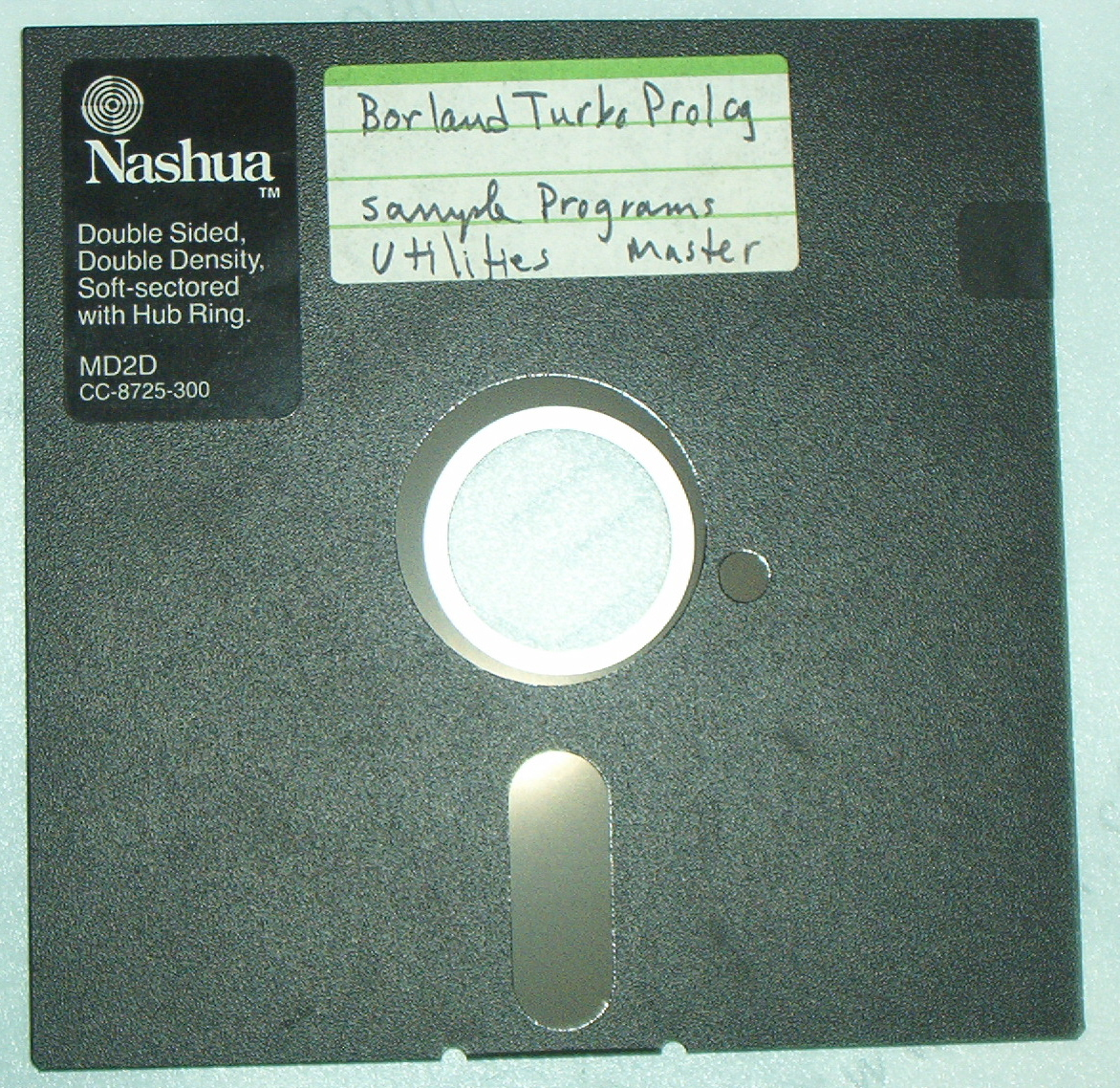
5 1/4-inch floppy disk with a hand-written label.

The command was originally designed to label floppy disks as a reminder of which one is in the disk drive. But it can be used for other types of storage media.

== Use ==
With no options, the command accepts a single argument may start with a drive letter (ending with a colon) and may end with label text. Without a drive letter, the command operates on the volume associated with the working directory. Without label text, the command clears the label.

For example, the command line label D:Backup sets the label of D: to "Backup".

With the /MP option, the command accepts up to two arguments: volume and label. In this case, the volume argument is treated as a mount point or a volume name. If volume name is specified, the /MP option is unnecessary.

== See also ==
- List of DOS commands
