= General Software =

General Software, Inc.
- Industry: Computer software
- Founded: 1989; 37 years ago in Washington, United States
- Fate: Purchased by Phoenix Technologies, Inc.
- Headquarters: Washington, USA
- Key people: Steve Jones
- Products: OEM-DOS, Network-DOS, Embedded DOS, Embedded DOS-ROM, Embedded DOS-XL, Embedded BIOS
- Website: n/a

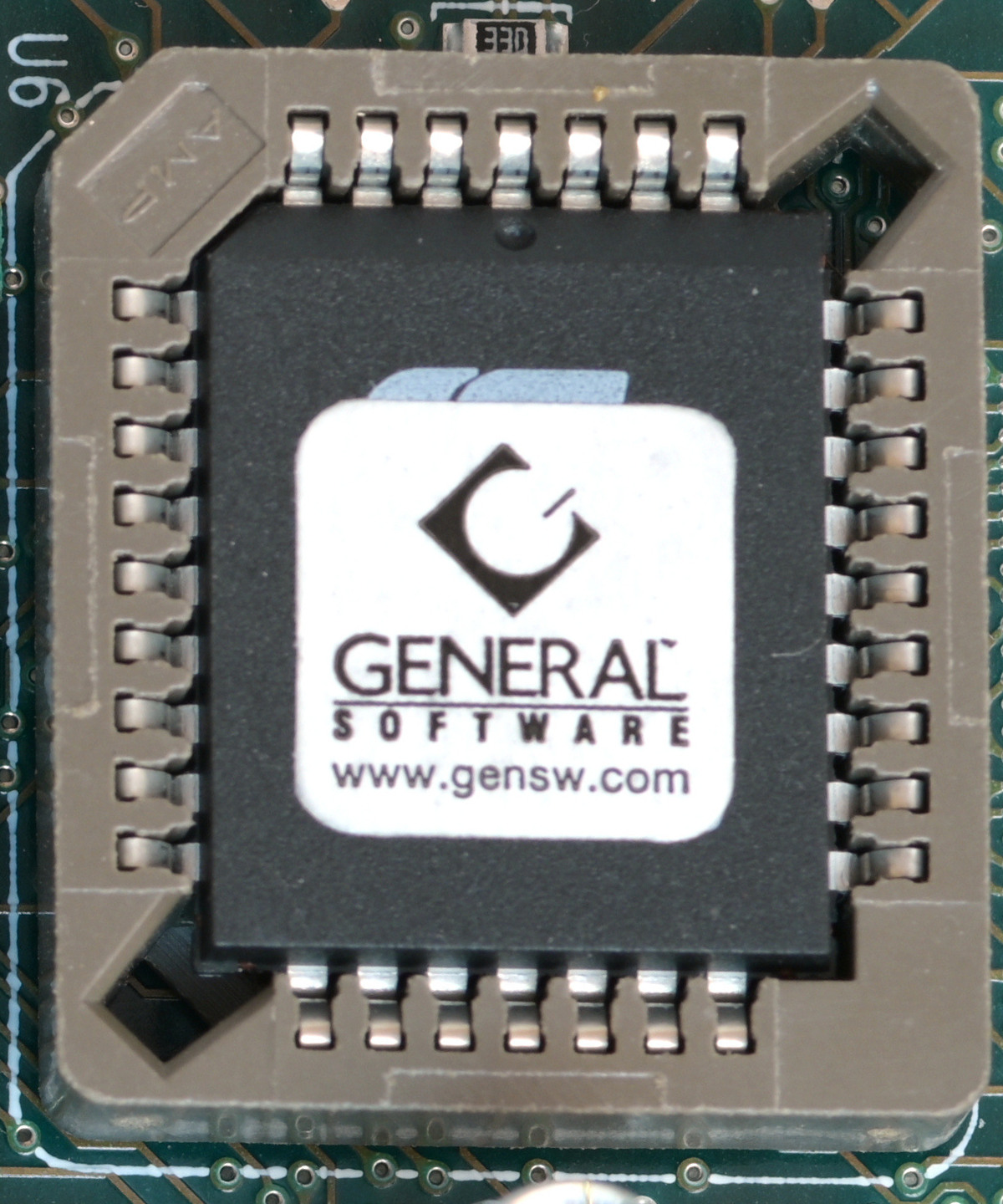
General Software-labeled flash memory from Silicon Storage Technology

General Software was a Washington, USA based creator and supplier of system software headquartered in Bellevue, Washington. It was founded in 1989 by Steve Jones and later incorporated in 1990 as General Software, Inc. In 2008, the company was purchased by Phoenix Technologies, Inc.

General Software developed firmware to support telecommunications, data communications, UMPC (Ultra Mobile Personal Computer), general consumer electronics, and support models designed for embedded ODMs (Original Design Manufacturer) and OEMs (Original Equipment Manufacturer).

Some of the products included General Software OEM-DOS, Network-DOS, Embedded DOS, Embedded DOS-ROM, Embedded DOS-XL and Embedded BIOS.

In 1998 they partnered with Caldera Thin Clients, Inc. in order to ship their Embedded BIOS with Caldera DR-DOS.

== See also ==
- Datalight ROM-DOS
