= System file =

Type of computer file

A system file in computers is a critical computer file without which a computer system may not operate correctly. These files may come as part of the operating system, a third-party device driver or other sources. Microsoft Windows and MS-DOS mark their more valuable system files with a "system" attribute to protect them against accidental deletion. (The system attribute can be manually put on any arbitrary file, but setting the system attribute n a file does not cause the file to become a system files)

Specific example of system files include the files with .sys filename extension in MS-DOS and Windows. In Windows NT family, the system files are mainly under the folder C:\Windows\System32. In the classic Mac OS they are in the System suitcase. In Unix-like systems the system files are located in the folder / or under folders such as /boot (Linux), /System/Library (macOS), /sbin and /usr/sbin (system utilities) and /usr/lib/modules (Linux loadable kernel modules).
