= Paragon Software Group =

German software company

Paragon Technologie GmbH
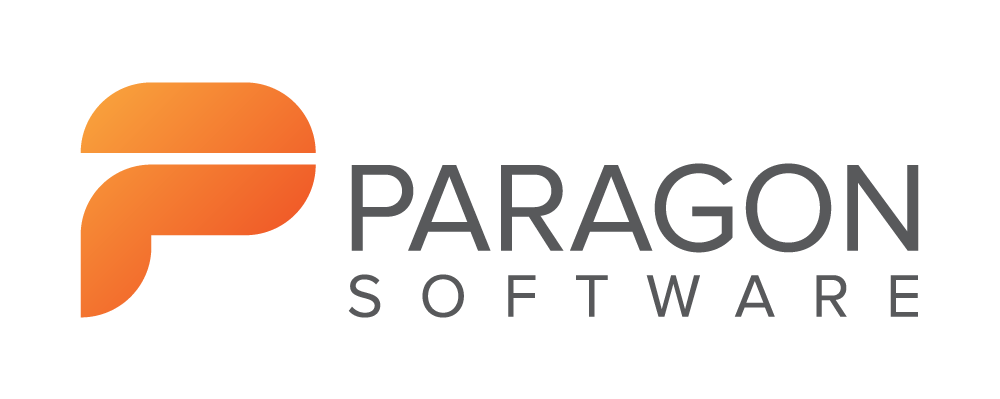
- Type: Privately held corporation
- Industry: Computer software and Embedded systems
- Founded: 1994; 32 years ago
- Headquarters: Freiburg im Breisgau, Germany
- Key people: Konstantin Komarov, Founder & CEO
- Products: Paragon Hard Disk Manager for Windows; Microsoft NTFS for Mac by Paragon Software; File System Link Suite; Protect & Restore
- Number of employees: 200+
- Website: www.paragon-software.com

Paragon Software Group is a German software company that develops hard drive management software, low-level file system drivers and storage technologies.

== Overview ==
The company is headquartered in Freiburg im Breisgau, Germany, with offices in the US, China, Japan, Poland, and Russia.

The company was established in 1994 by a group of Moscow Institute of Physics and Technology (MIPT) students, including founder/CEO Konstantin Komarov. A separate mobile division, called the Mobility Division, was formed in 1995. The German office opened in 1998, the Swiss office in 2000.

== History ==
In 2004, the company started working with Fujitsu-Siemens on its handheld PCs Russian localization. Next year, the company expanded the product line of office and gaming applications for Symbian OS and received the "Developer of the Year" award in the Handango Champion Awards 2005.

In 2011, PCMag recognized the company's flagship Paragon Hard Disk Manager as the best hard drive management program. Paragon Software Group also won Global Telecoms Business Innovation Award 2011 for their mobile product.

== Products ==
Paragon Software Group is serving two markets:

1. Data security and storage management – disaster recovery and server optimization.
2. Software for smartphones – multilingual on-line handwriting recognition, localization, business and productivity applications, games, 120 multilingual dictionaries, and encyclopedias.

=== Data security and storage management ===
- Paragon Hard Disk Manager, including a tool named Partition Manager for resizing partitions.
- Paragon File System Link (proprietary).
- File system drivers, including Paragon NTFS for Mac and APFS for Windows.

Konstantin Komarov of Paragon Software have also contributed to the NTFS3 driver in the Linux kernel.

=== Software for smartphones ===
==== Slovoed ====
Slovoed is a dictionary and phrasebook app available for more than 37 world languages.

It incorporates more than 350 electronic dictionaries, encyclopedias and phrase books developed in conjunction with Duden, Langenscheidt, Oxford UP, PONS/Klett, Le Robert, VOX, and other publishing houses.

==== PenReader ====
PenReader is a real-time handwriting recognition technology for touchscreens with support for 17 languages. The technology is used in a number of prominent iOS and Android applications, such as Evernote, Handwriting Dato and Handwrite Note Free, MyScript Calculator. A 2016 MacWorld review of PenReader was headlined "Disappointing" and added "When it comes to handwriting recognition, PenReader isn't particularly accurate, intuitive, or easy to use."

== Distribution channels ==
Paragon distributes online through the company website, a network of value-added resellers, distributors and OEMs.

The global partnerships of Paragon Software Group include ASUS, Avast, Belkin, D-Link, HP, Intel, Microsoft, Netgear, Nvidia, Realtek, Seagate, Siemens, Technicolor, Telechips, Western Digital, Wyplay.

== See also ==
- PTS/DOS (PTS=PhysTechSoft; the "P" is also a hint to Paragon)
