= FastCopy =

Performance optimized backup software

- FastCopy running on Windows 10
- Developer: Shirouzu Hiroaki
- Release: September 28, 2004; 21 years ago
- Stable release: 5.11.3 / 18 May 2026; 47 days ago
- Operating system: Windows 7 and later; Windows Server 2012 and later
- Platform: Microsoft Windows
- Available in: English/Japanese
- Website: fastcopy.jp

FastCopy is software for file copying on Windows. Originally open-source, under the GPLv3 license, later releases were freeware with a note that "Due to various circumstances, distribution of the source code is temporarily suspended". In version 5.0.0, licensing was changed for a newly added Pro version with additional features, and separated the use case in non-domestic environments, while previous versions allow using FastCopy in workplace.

There are 32- and 64-bit versions, which run under Windows 7 and later, and Windows Server 2012 and later. The total size of the executable and DLL files comprising 64-bit version 4.1.7 is 1.3MB. It can run as a free-standing portable application or be integrated into the Windows shell, and claims to achieve reading and writing performance close to the device limit.

In a test conducted in 2008 by lifehacker, Fastcopy was several times faster than its rival Teracopy, a program with similar functionality. However, both programs have been updated since then. A more extensive comparison was performed between TeraCopy v2.07beta, KillCopy v2.85, FastCopy v1.99r4, SuperCopier v2.2bet and published on a forum in 2009.

In Microsoft Windows prior to Windows 10 v1607, programs that use the Win32 API, such as Windows Explorer, do not support path names longer than 260 UTF-16 characters; later versions of Windows allow this to be changed via the registry or group policy. FastCopy does not use Microsoft's API and places its own calls to the NT kernel, allowing operations with path names longer than 260 characters.

In 2015 FastCopyV2.11 (BSD License) was ported to Mac OS X by Japanese PostProduction L'espace Vision. It is sold on the Mac App Store as "RapidCopy". In 2016 L'espace Vision released the Linux version of "RapidCopy for Linux" on GitHub under a BSD 2-Clause license.

== Reception ==
Bogdan Popa, who reviewed FastCopy 3.92 in Softpedia, praised the product as being "An overall efficient and reliable file management tool" and gave it 4.5 out of 5 stars. User ratings by 419 users gave it an average of 4.2 out of 5 stars.

On December 25, 2015 (JST), FastCopy was given Grand Prize in the Windows Forest Awards.

== Ported versions ==
- macOS: RapidCopy
- Linux: RapidCopy for Linux

== See also ==
- RichCopy
- Robocopy
- Teracopy
- Ultracopier
