= RichCopy =

File copy utility

- Developer: Microsoft
- Stable release: 4.0.217
- Operating system: Windows XP, Windows Vista, Windows 7, Windows Server 2003
- License: Proprietary

RichCopy is a file copying utility program for Windows developed by Ken Tamaru of Microsoft Corporation that was discontinued in 2010. It is multi-threaded uses a graphical user interface (GUI), in contrast to many competing tools that are single-threaded and/or use a command-line interface (CLI).

== Features ==
- Supports multiple, simultaneous file transfers (via multi-threaded implementation), which may reduce the time required for to transfer a set of files
- Provides both CLI and GUI
- Via GUI, can generate CLI commands to repeat the actions performed in the GUI.

== Criticisms ==
- Bugs not fixed before support was discontinued remain; the utility is best utilized by experienced users who know how to verify that copy operations have completed successfully without errors
- The utility is not supported by Microsoft. The program has not been updated since 2009, despite numerous users requesting bug fixes
- Duplicates Robocopy functionality

== Limitations ==
The utility will not copy open files. A competing tool, GS RichCopy 360, can copy open files.

== See also ==
- copy (command)
- Robocopy
- rsync
- SyncToy
- Teracopy
- Ultracopier
- XCOPY
