= DRDOS =

DRDOS may refer to:

- DR-DOS (originally DR DOS), a computer operating system developed by Digital Research, Novell, Caldera, and DeviceLogics
- DRDOS, Inc. also known as DeviceLogics, a (former) developer of DR-DOS
- Distributed reflective denial of service (DRDoS), a type of attempt to disrupt a computer network
