= Superstore (disambiguation) =

A superstore, also called a big-box store, is a physically large retail establishment, usually part of a chain of stores.

Superstore can also refer to:

- Real Canadian Superstore, a Canadian hypermarket chain founded in 1979
- SuperStor, a brand of disk compression software manufactured by Addstor, Inc. in the 1990s
- Superstore (TV series), an NBC sitcom that premiered in 2015
- Saturday Superstore A BBC Children's TV series of the 1980s

== See also ==
- Supermarket
