= MPPC =

MPPC can refer to:

- Motion Picture Patents Company
- Microsoft Point-to-Point Compression
- Menlo Park Presbyterian Church
- Milk Sphingomyelin (1-Myristoyl,2-Palmitoyl-sn-Glycero 3-PhosphoCholine)
- Multi-pixel photon counter or silicon photomultiplier
