= Exar Corporation =

American semiconductor manufacturer (1971–2017)

Exar
- Trade name: Exar Corporation
- Type: Subsidiary
- Traded as: NYSE: EXAR
- Industry: Electronics; Semiconductor
- Founded: 1971; 55 years ago in California, United States
- Defunct: 2017
- Fate: Acquired by MaxLinear
- Headquarters: United States
- Number of employees: 269 (2016)
- Parent: Rohm (1971–1990)
- Website: exar.com at the Wayback Machine (archived 2016-02-29)

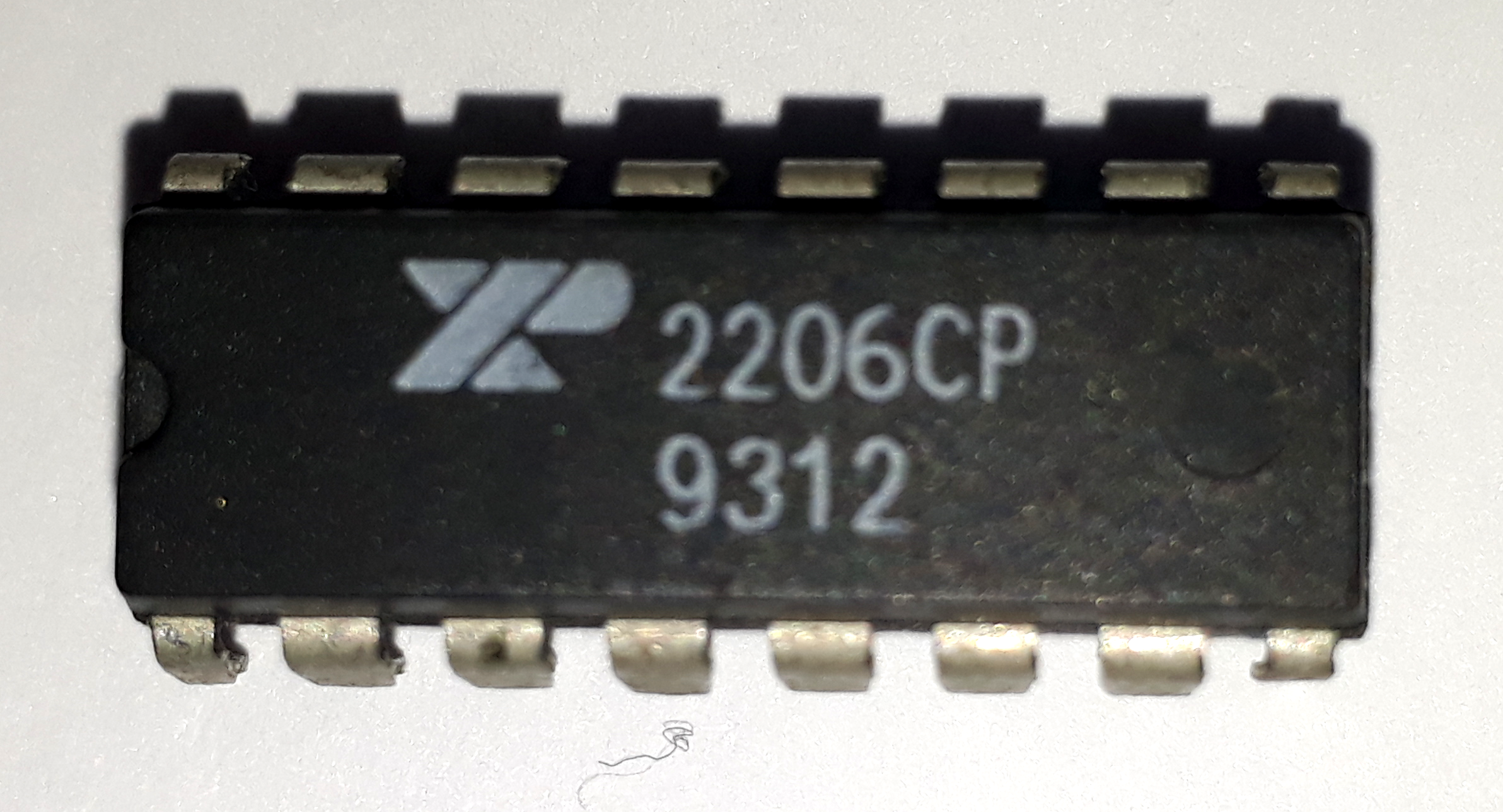
Function generator integrated circuit XR-2206 by Exar

Exar Corporation was an American semiconductor manufacturer active from 1971 to 2017 as a subsidiary of the Japanese firm Rohm. It was acquired by MaxLinear in May 2017 and maintained as a wholly owned subsidiary for a short while.

== History ==
Earlier logo of Exar Corporation

The Japanese semiconductor company Rohm established Exar as a California-based American subsidiary in 1971. At that time, the integrated circuit boards designed and manufactured by Rohm were developed in the United States, and establishing an American subsidiary provided closer ties to the design process and provided a marketing foothold.

In the early 1980s, when Exar was running sales figures of around US$25 million annually, only about one-third of sales were through its parent, Rohm. Part of the success of Exar and Rohm in the early 1980s stemmed from proprietary technologies developed between the two.

As a result of pressure from the U.S. Government for Japan to reduce its involvement in American industry, in particular in the semiconductor industry, Rohm began slowly divesting itself of Exar. Following Exar's initial public offering in 1985, Rohm's share of ownership had dropped to under 70%.

Exar's acquisition of Exel Microelectronics in the mid-1980s contributed heavily to a financial downturn in the company. Exar purchased Exel for its technology, but also for its chip fabrication facilities; however, unbeknownst to Exar at the time of purchase, those plants were not run-ready and required large amounts of capital investment, which ate into Exar profits through the end of the decade. In response to these problems, Rohm reversed its position on Exar by purchasing outstanding stock, leading to its again fully owning the company. Reacquisition by Rohm freed Exar to fully capitalize assets acquired from Exel and turn up the investment in research and development, leading again to profitability based in large part of new introductions in the EEPROM and ASIC product spaces.

After Rohm had rescued the company and supported its return to profitability, it changed course and began divesting again, leading in 1990 to holding less than 50 percent of Exar. From its inception, Exar's top executive staff and board had been picked by Rohm, and consisted largely of Japanese expatriates. This changed in 1992 when Rohm removed Exar's chief executive officer, Nabuo Hatta, who had served in an executive post since at least 1985, when he was president of the company. Exar's board subsequently hired George Wells, a Scotsman educated at the University of Glasgow, as the company's new chief executive; Wells had previously held positions at General Electric and LSI Logic.

Wells oversaw a reorganization and re-prioritization of product offerings and introduced a culture of quality, leading to major increases in sales and income. Armed with a large cash surplus, and following Rohm's final divestment of Exar assets in 1994, Wells went on an acquisition spree in 1994 and 1995 which led to the purchases of Origin Technology, Micro Power Systems, Startech Semiconductor and Silicon Microstructures; all in all, these purchases enriched the technologies available to Exar. Acquiring so many companies in such a short period had consequences for the company, and Exar lost its profitability by early 1995.

On April 3, 2009, Exar Corporation closed the acquisition of hi/fn, inc., a transaction which included stock and about US$67 million in cash. On August 3, 2011, Exar Corporation rang the opening bell at the NASDAQ MarketSite in New York. In honor of the occasion, Pete Rodriguez, President & Chief Executive Officer, rang the Opening Bell. On March 22, 2013, Exar acquired the assets of Altior in Eatontown, New Jersey. On July 5, 2013, it acquired Stretch, Inc. On June 3, 2014, it acquired most of Integrated Memory Logic Limited.

On March 29, 2017, MaxLinear Inc. announced it would buy Exar Corporation for about $661.6 million cash. The acquisition of Exar Corp for $687 million was completed in May 2017.

== Products ==
Exar offers PMICs that are used in SoCs, DSPs, FPGAs as well as video processors, power distribution switches, analog front end sensor interfaces and synchronous optical network transceivers. Further products include BITS framers and LIUs, inductive step-down converters, UART bridges, as well as GPIO expanders.

== See also ==
- Economy of Fremont, California
