= Microsoft Point-to-Point Compression =

Microsoft Point-to-Point Compression (MPPC; described in RFC 2118) is a streaming data compression algorithm based on an implementation of Lempel–Ziv using a sliding window buffer. According to Hifn's IP statement, MPPC was patent-encumbered (last US patent granted on 1996-07-02).

Whereas V.44 or V.42bis operate at layer 1 on the OSI model, MPPC operates on layer 2, giving it a significant advantage in terms of computing resources available to it. The dialup modem's in-built compression (V.44 or V.42bis) can only occur after the data has been serially transmitted to the modem, typically at a maximum rate of 115,200 bit/s. MPPC, as it is controlled by the operating system, can receive as much data as it wishes to compress, before forwarding it on to the modem.

The modem's hardware must not delay data too much, while waiting for more to compress in one packet, otherwise an unacceptable latency level will result. It also cannot afford to, as this would require both sizable computing resources (on the scale of a modem) as well as significant buffer RAM. Software compression such as MPPC is free to use the host computer's resources, exceeding the modem's by several orders of magnitude. This allows it to keep a much larger buffer to work on at any one time, and it processes through a given amount of data much faster.

The end result is that where V.44 may achieve a maximum of 4:1 compression (230 kbit/s) but is usually limited to 115.2 kbit/s, MPPC is capable of a maximum of 8:1 compression (460 kbit/s). MPPC also, given the far greater computing power at its disposal, is more effective on data than V.44 and achieves higher compression ratios when 8:1 isn't achievable.

== See also ==
- Microsoft Point-to-Point Encryption (MPPE)
- LZ77
- LZS
- Stac Electronics
