= Double Tools for DoubleSpace =

- The product packaging
- Developer(s): Addstor, Inc.
- Stable release: 1993; 32 years ago (1.20)
- Operating system: MS-DOS 6.0 and Windows
- Type: Disk compression
- License: Proprietary

Double Tools for DoubleSpace is a software utility released in 1993 by the Menlo Park-based company Addstor, Inc. The utility functioned as an add-on to the disk compression software DoubleSpace, supplied with MS-DOS 6.0, adding a number of features not available in the standard version.

== Features ==
Most of the Double Tools utilities worked from Microsoft Windows, providing a graphical view and control panel of the compressed drives on the computer (the utilities supplied with MS-DOS only operated from DOS-mode). Double Tools also contained a number of disk checking and rescue/recovery utilities. Some of the included utilities were called Silent Tools. One of the unique features of its time was the capability to defragment a DoubleSpace compressed drive in the background.

Some of the features, including the background defragmentation capability, required the user to let Double Tools replace the standard compression driver for MS-DOS (DBLSPACE.BIN) with one developed by Addstor, claimed to be 100% compatible with DoubleSpace and the Microsoft Real-Time Compression Interface introduced in MS-DOS 6.0. This driver added a number of extra features, such as the use of 32-bit code paths when it detected an Intel 80386 or higher CPU, caching capabilities and - in addition to its supporting the use of the Upper Memory Area - also permitted the use of Extended Memory for some of its buffers (reducing the driver's total footprint in conventional and upper memory, albeit at the cost of somewhat reduced speed).

Other features provided by Double Tools was the ability to have compressed removable media auto-mounted as they were used (instead of the user having to do this manually). Although this capability was later introduced into the standard version of DoubleSpace found in MS-DOS 6.2, Double Tools also had the capability to put a special utility on compressed floppy disks that made it possible to access the compressed data even on computers that didn't have DoubleSpace (or Double Tools).

Another interesting function was the ability to split a compressed volume over multiple floppy disks, being able to see the entire volume with only the first disk inserted (and being prompted to change discs as necessary). It was also possible to share a compressed volume with a remote computer.
