= Advanced Power Management =

API for power management in IBM-compatible computers

- Abbreviation: APM
- Status: Deprecated
- First published: 1992
- Latest version: 1.2; 1996
- Organization: Intel, Microsoft
- Successor: ACPI
- Domain: Power management
- Website: intel.com/IAL/powermgm at the Wayback Machine (archived 1996-12-20)

Advanced power management (APM) is a technical standard for power management developed by Intel and Microsoft and released in 1992 which enables an operating system running an IBM-compatible personal computer to work with the BIOS (part of the computer's firmware) to achieve power management.

Revision 1.2 was the last version of the APM specification, released in 1996. ACPI is the successor to APM. Microsoft dropped support for APM in Windows Vista. The Linux kernel still mostly supports APM, though support for APM CPU idle was dropped in version 3.0.

== Overview ==
The layers in APM

APM uses a layered approach to manage devices. APM-aware applications (which include device drivers) talk to an OS-specific APM driver. This driver communicates to the APM-aware BIOS, which controls the hardware. There is the ability to opt out of APM control on a device-by-device basis, which can be used if a driver wants to communicate directly with a hardware device.

Communication occurs both ways; power management events are sent from the BIOS to the APM driver, and the APM driver sends information and requests to the BIOS via function calls. In this way the APM driver is an intermediary between the BIOS and the operating system.

Power management happens in two ways; through the above-mentioned function calls from the APM driver to the BIOS requesting power state changes, and automatically based on device activity.

In APM 1.0 and APM 1.1, power management is almost fully controlled by the BIOS. In APM 1.2, the operating system can control PM time (e.g. suspend timeout).

In 1997, Phoenix Technologies released "APM 2.0" which is a kernel device driver compatible with an APM 1.2 BIOS.

== Power management events ==
There are 12 power events (such as standby, suspend and resume requests, and low battery notifications), plus OEM-defined events, that can be sent from the APM BIOS to the operating system. The APM driver regularly polls for event change notifications.

Power Management Events:

Name	Code	Comment
System Standby Request Notification	0x0001	
System Suspend Request Notification	0x0002	
Normal Resume System Notification	0x0003	
Critical Resume System Notification	0x0004	
Battery Low Notification	0x0005	
Power Status Change Notification	0x0006	
Update Time Notification	0x0007	
Critical System Suspend Notification	0x0008	
User System Standby Request Notification	0x0009	
User System Suspend Request Notification	0x000A	
System Standby Resume Notification	0x000B	
Capabilities Change Notification	0x000C	Due to setup or device insertion/removal

== APM functions ==
There are 21 APM function calls defined that the APM driver can use to query power management statuses, or request power state transitions. Example function calls include letting the BIOS know about current CPU usage (the BIOS may respond to such a call by placing the CPU in a low-power state, or returning it to its full-power state), retrieving the current power state of a device, or requesting a power state change.

Name	Code	Comment
APM Installation Check	0x00	
APM Real Mode Interface Connect	0x01	
APM Protected Mode 16-bit Interface Connect	0x02	Avoids real or virtual86 mode.
APM Protected Mode 32-bit Interface Connect	0x03	Avoids real or virtual86 mode.
APM Interface Disconnect	0x04	
CPU Idle	0x05	Requests system suspend. 0) Clock halted until timer tick interrupt. 1) Slow clock
CPU Busy	0x06	Driver tells system APM to restore clock speed of the CPU.
Set Power State	0x07	Set system or device into Suspend/Standby/Off state.
Enable/Disable Power Management	0x08	
Restore APM BIOS Power-On Defaults	0x09	
Get Power Status	0x0A	Supports AC status "On backup power". And battery status.
Get PM Event	0x0B	Checks for APM events. Shall be called once per second.
Get Power State	0x0C	
Enable/Disable Device Power Management	0x0D	
APM Driver Version	0x0E	
Engage/Disengage Power Management	0x0F	APM management for a specific device.
Get Capabilities	0x10	
Get/Set/Disable Resume Timer	0x11	
Enable/Disable Resume on Ring Indicator	0x12	
Enable/Disable Timer Based Requests	0x13	
OEM APM Installation Check	0x80	Tells if APM BIOS supports OEM hardware dependent functions.
OEM APM Function	0x80	Access to OEM specific functions.

== Power states ==
The APM specification defines system power states and device power states.

=== System power states ===
APM defines five power states for the computer system:

- Full On: The computer is powered on, and no devices are in a power saving mode.
- APM Enabled: The computer is powered on, and APM is controlling device power management as needed.
- APM Standby: Most devices are in their low-power state, the CPU is slowed or stopped, and the system state is saved. The computer can be returned to its former state quickly (in response to activity such as the user pressing a key on the keyboard).
- APM Suspend: Most devices are powered off, but the system state is saved. The computer can be returned to its former state, but takes a relatively long time. (Hibernation is a special form of the APM Suspend state).
- Off: The computer is turned off.

=== Device power states ===
APM also defines power states that APM-aware hardware can implement. There is no requirement that an APM-aware device implement all states.

The four states are:

- Device On: The device is in full power mode.
- Device Power Managed: The device is still powered on, but some functions may not be available, or may have reduced performance.
- Device Low Power: The device is not working. Power is maintained so that the device may be 'woken up'.
- Device Off: The device is powered off.

== Hardware components ==
=== CPU ===
The CPU core (defined in APM as the CPU clock, cache, system bus and system timers) is treated specially in APM, as it is the last device to be powered down, and the first device to be powered back up. The CPU core is always controlled through the APM BIOS (there is no option to control it through a driver). Drivers can use APM function calls to notify the BIOS about CPU usage, but it is up to the BIOS to act on this information; a driver cannot directly tell the CPU to go into a power saving state.

=== ATA drives ===
The ATA specification and SATA specification defines APM provisions for hard drives, which specifies a trade-off between spin-down frequency and always-on performance. Unlike the BIOS-side APM, the ATA APM and SATA APM has never been deprecated. An operating system may use ATA STANDBY and ATA IDLE commands to manage ATA APM features.

Aggressive spin-down frequencies may reduce drive lifespan by unnecessarily accumulating load cycles; most modern drives are specified to sustain 300,000 cycles and usually last at least 600,000. On the other hand, not spinning down the drive will cause extra power draw and heat generation; high temperatures also reduce the lifespan of hard drives.

== See also ==
- Active State Power Management - hardware power management protocol for PCI Express
- Green computing
- BatteryMAX
