= Hifn =

American semiconductor company (1996–2009)

- Type: Public
- Industry: Semiconductors
- Founded: 1996; 30 years ago in Carlsbad, California
- Defunct: April 3, 2009
- Fate: Acquired by Exar Corporation

Hifn (styled Hi/fn) was a semiconductor manufacturer founded in Carlsbad, California, in 1996 as a corporate spin-off from Stac Electronics. The company was later headquartered in Los Gatos, California, and had offices in North America, Europe and Asia. It designed and sold security processors. It was acquired by Exar Corporation in 2009.

== History ==
=== 1996-2008: Founding and early years ===
Logo used from 1996 to 2003

Hifn was founded in 1996 as a spin-out of the semiconductor company Stac, Inc. It held its initial public offering in December 1998. The company's stock was traded on the NASDAQ under the symbol HIFN.

In 1998, Hifn became the first company to offer a processor with integrated encryption and compression, following this in 1999 with the fastest security processor for VPNs.

In 2000, Hifn announced an "Intelligent Packet Processor": a security co-processor capable of not only performing raw algorithm processing, but also modifying the complete packet, allowing its processors to transform an IP packet into an IPSec packet in a single pass in the security processor, with only the policy and IPsec stack being required on the host CPU.

In 2001, the company announced a security processor featuring the Advanced Encryption Standard (AES) algorithm.

In 2004 it followed on from its packet processor with an IPsec protocol processor, capable of performing IPsec and Internet Key Exchange processing with no CPU intervention. They also adapted this processor for the storage area network market, for applications such as iSCSI.

A secondary offering was priced on April 12, 2004.

Hifn also offered security processors for secure VoIP and WiMax applications, and marketed them for "application-aware" flow classifiers and search engines.

In earlier 2004, Hifn acquired part of IBM Network Processor assets in addition to PowerNP's intellectual property license. Hifn became the sole vendor of PowerNP (IBM code: Rainier) to some telecom/datacom equipment manufacturers.

=== Acquisition by Exar ===
On April 3, 2009, semiconductor manufacturer Exar Corporation closed the acquisition of Hifn. The transaction included stock and about $67 million in cash.

== Products ==
Hifn held the patents for the Lempel–Ziv–Stac and Microsoft Point-to-Point Compression compression algorithms.
