= Pigeonholing =

Classification of entities into categories

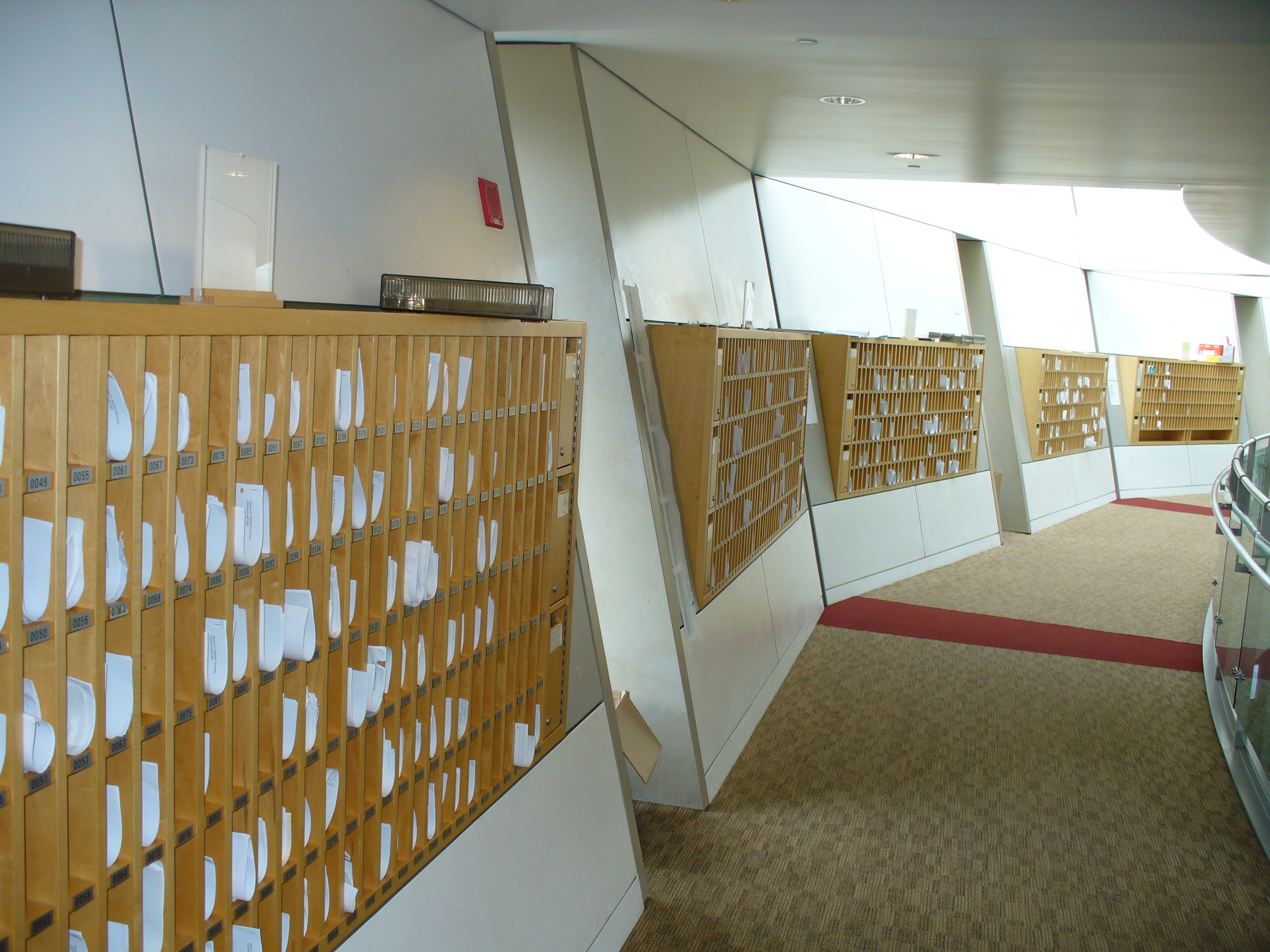
Pigeon-hole messageboxes at Stanford University

Pigeonholing is a process that attempts to classify disparate entities into a limited number of categories (usually, mutually exclusive ones).

The term usually carries connotations of criticism, implying that the classification scheme referred to inadequately reflects the entities being sorted, or that it is based on stereotypes.

== Pitfalls ==
Various classification schemes often suffer from pitfalls such as these:

- The categories may be poorly defined, inadequately described, or subjective.
  - Example: A poor person and a rich person may have different ideas about what counts as "too expensive".
- A single entity may be suited to more than one category.
  - Example: Rhubarb is both "poisonous" (the leaves) and "safe to eat" (the stem).
- Entities may not fit into any available category.
  - Example: A person who is moving from one city to another does not live in either city.
- Entities may change over time, so they no longer fit the category in which they have been placed.
  - Example: Certain species of fish may change from male to female during their life.
  - Example: A child who is categorized as "unable to read" may learn to read soon afterwards.
- Some properties are better viewed as a continuum than as separate categories.
  - Example: There are people of every height, so categorizing all of them as "short", "average", and "tall" can result in people of almost exactly the same height being put in different categories. The tallest "short" person and the shortest "average" person will be almost the same height.

An example of pigeonholing in everyday conversation occurs when a person making an apolitical or barely political comment is assumed to have a certain political belief, without ascertaining their political stance. Such an erroneous designation is especially erroneous when assigning it to people who live in places where the left–right dichotomy is not present.

== See also ==
- Archetype
- Labelling
- Pigeonhole principle
- Typecasting
