= CompactGUI =

Open-source software for compressing video games

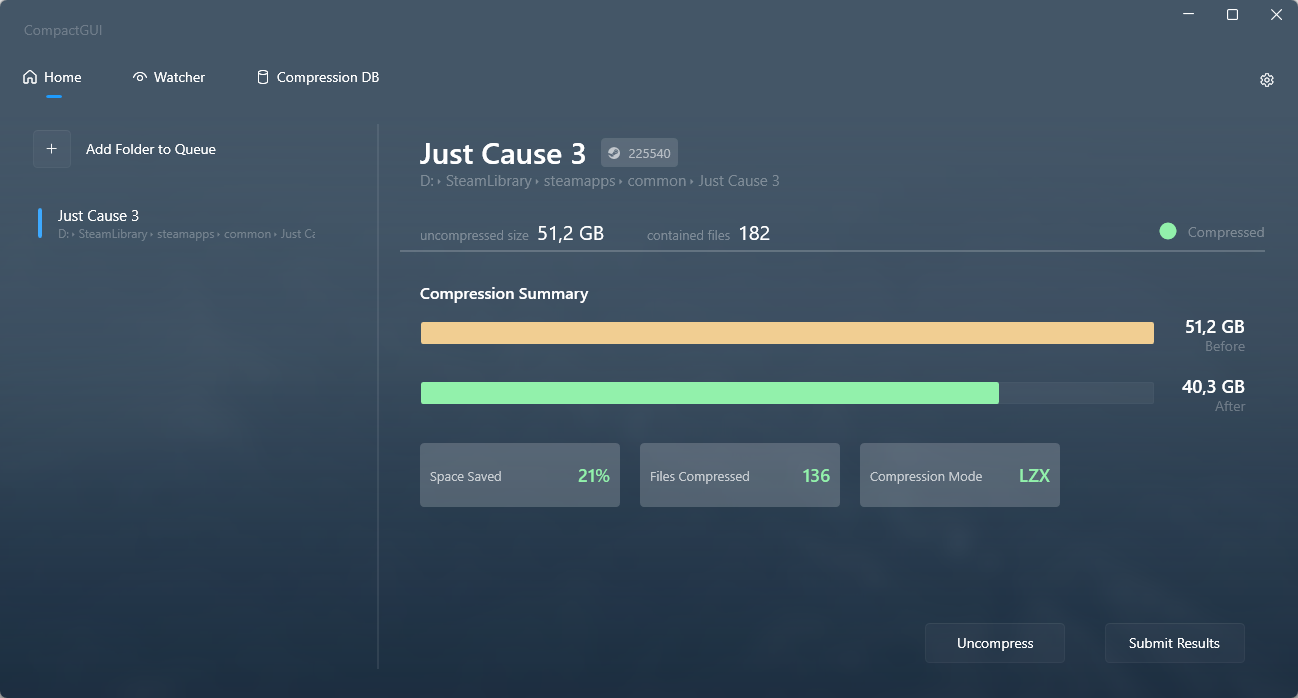
- Screenshot of the program showing space savings after compressing Just Cause 3
- Developer: IridiumIO
- Stable release: Version 4.0 Beta 6 / 6 July 2025
- Written in: Visual Basic (.NET), C#
- Operating system: Windows
- Size: 10 MB (no embedded libraries); 64 MB (with embedded libraries)
- Available in: English
- Type: Data compression
- License: GPL-3.0-only
- Repository: GitHub

CompactGUI is an open-source program for compressing video games, programs and folders. It uses various compression algorithms under the compact Windows tool to decrease the file size of application data.

== Features ==
CompactGUI uses the built-in NTFS compression tools in Windows to reduce the size of game files, while implementing a graphical user interface for easier communication. The program offers four types of compression: three levels of XPRESS (with block sizes 4k, 8k and 16k) and LZX. The program includes an option to skip compressing files with a poor data compression ratio, such as files already compressed via another method. CompactGUI also features a watchlist that monitors game updates, allowing new and modified files to be automatically compressed.

When playing the game, the files will be selectively decompressed as they're accessed. Any compression applied to game files is reversible and can be undone if the performance is noticeably affected or the storage gains are deemed insufficient. It is not recommended to use the tool with games that utilize DirectStorage API, due to the decompression method negating the API's function of streaming assets directly from the drive. While the program was made with video game data compression in mind, mostly due to the ever-increasing system requirements of modern games, any applications or folders may be compressed.

== Benchmarks ==
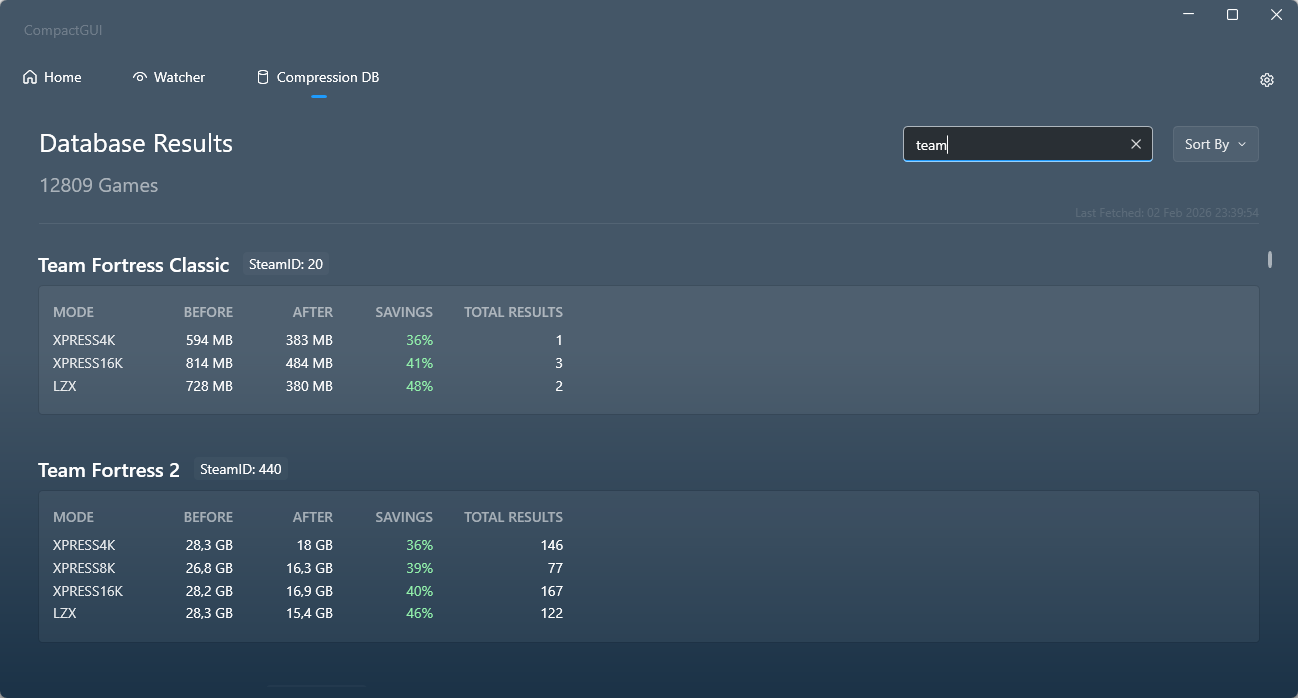
In-app database of popular games and their space savings

CompactGUI features an in-app database of compressed games and their space savings automatically compiled from various users. Here are some comparisons between various games' original sizes and their compressed forms using LZX, as reported by XDA-Developers:

Game	Original size	Compressed size	Storage gain	Compression ratio
Baldur's Gate 3 (2023)	152.71 GB	134.54 GB (88%)	18.17 GB	1.135
Cities: Skylines (2015)	13.27 GB	6.30 GB (47%)	6.97 GB	2.106
Counter-Strike 2 (2023)	38.17 GB	27.04 GB (71%)	11.13 GB	1.412
Cyberpunk 2077 (2020)	80.20 GB	78.25 GB (98%)	1.95 GB	1.025
Half-Life: Alyx (2020)	72.52 GB	58.08 GB (80%)	14.44 GB	1.249
Little Kitty: Big City (2024)	13.43 GB	5.44 GB (40%)	7.99 GB	2.469

== Reception ==
XDA-Developers praised the app, calling it a "fantastic" choice for gaming handhelds and a "lifeline" for users running out of space. Various sources reported that, with the advancement of CPU technology, the real-time decompression of files has little performance overhead and can actually decrease loading times due to the smaller files being inherently faster to load; this is especially true for slower mechanical hard drives.

== See also ==
- DriveSpace
