= SeaTools =

Software for hard disk diagnostic

- Screenshot of SeaTools for Windows 1.4.0.2. It has detected three hard disk drives, one of them (the second) is a Seagate Technology model for which it is designed. Three tests have been run on disks. In order: S.M.A.R.T test, short self-test, short generic test.
- Developer: Seagate Technology
- Release: January 30, 2007; 19 years ago
- Stable release: DOS: 2.23 (December 31, 2010; 15 years ago); Windows: 5.2.5 (January 8, 2026; 10 months ago)
- Operating system: DOS; Microsoft Windows
- Platform: .NET Framework
- Available in: English, Chinese, French, Italian, German, Japanese, Portuguese, Spanish, Russian
- License: Freeware
- Website: www.seagate.com/support/downloads/seatools/

SeaTools is a computer hard disk analysis software developed and released by Seagate Technology. It exists as a version for DOS (bundled in a bootable medium with FreeDOS) and Microsoft Windows. It can perform short and long drive self-tests and read/write tests, extract S.M.A.R.T. indicators and drive information, and perform advanced tests. It was created by Seagate in response to the fact that more than one third of all drives sent in for repair were actually not defective at all, thus creating unnecessary costs for retailers and the company by having to ship and analyze such disks.

== SeaTools for DOS ==
SeaTools for DOS comes in a package with the FreeDOS operating system. It can be downloaded as a bootable ISO image from the Seagate website.

== SeaTools for Windows ==
The Windows version of SeaTools supports any hard disk regardless of manufacturer. It supports analysis for disks connected via PATA/SATA, USB, IEEE 1394, SAS and SCSI.

== SeaTools Enterprise ==
The enterprise edition is still provided as a legacy version for Seagate hard disks only. It supports only SCSI or Fibre Channel drives and is designed for use with servers and workstations by supporting tests of multiple drives simultaneously as well as sequentially.

== See also ==
- Smartmontools
