= Stac Electronics =

Defunct American technology company

Stac, Inc.
- Formerly: State of the Art Consulting; Stac Electronics
- Type: Public
- Industry: Computer software
- Founded: 1983; 43 years ago as State of the Art Consulting in Pasadena, California, United States
- Founder: Gary Clow, Doug Whiting, John Tanner, Mike Schuster, William Dally, Scott Karns, Robert Monsour, Robert Johnson, Hugh Ness
- Fate: Dissolved in 2002; 24 years ago
- Headquarters: Carlsbad, California, United States
- Products: Stacker disk compression utility

Stac Electronics, originally incorporated as State of the Art Consulting and later shortened to Stac, Inc., was a technology company founded in 1983. It is known primarily for its Lempel–Ziv–Stac lossless compression algorithm and Stacker disk compression utility for compressing data for storage.

== History ==
=== 1983–1994 ===
The original founders included five Caltech graduate students in Computer Science (Gary Clow, Doug Whiting, John Tanner, Mike Schuster and William Dally), two engineers from the industry (Scott Karns and Robert Monsour) and two board members from the industry (Robert Johnson of Southern California Ventures and Hugh Ness of Scientific Atlanta). The first employee was Bruce Behymer, a Caltech undergraduate in Engineering and Applied Science.

Originally headquartered in Pasadena, California and later in Carlsbad, California, the company received venture capital funding to pursue a business plan as a fabless chip company selling application-specific standard products to the tape drive industry. The plan was to include expansion into the disk drive market, which was much larger than the tape drive market. Following the success of Cirrus in the disk drive market, this was the real basis for venture capitalists' interest in Stac.

As part of the application engineering to adapt its data compression chips for use in disk drives, the company implemented a DOS driver that transparently compressed data written to a PC hard disk and decompressed the data transparently upon subsequent hard disk reads. In doing so, it discovered that given the relative speed difference between the PC processor and the disk drive access times, it was possible to perform the data compression in software, obviating the need for a data compression chip in every disk drive, as it was planning to produce. This DOS driver was written in x86 assembly language under contract by Paul Houle.

In 1990, the company released Stacker, a disk compression utility. The product was highly successful, due to the relatively small capacities (20 to 80 megabytes) and high prices of contemporary hard drives, at a time when larger software packages such as Microsoft's new Windows user interface were becoming popular. On average, Stacker doubled disk capacity, and usually increased disk performance by compressing the data before writing and after reading, compensating for the relative slowness of the drives. Stac sold several million units of Stacker over the product's lifetime.

They also released a hardware product called STAC Coprocessor Card, which claimed to not only improve the compression of the files, but to decrease the time needed to compress files. Salient Software would license Stac's acceleration technology for use in its NuBus DoubleUp and PDS Bullet cards for the Macintosh, though it would use Salient's own DiskDoubler software.

=== 1994–2002 ===
At some time prior to 1996, the company relocated its main office from Carlsbad to Carmel Valley, in San Diego, and maintained a programming group in Estonia. After settling the lawsuit with Microsoft, Stac attempted to expand its product portfolio in the utility software segment by adding additional storage and communication titles through internal development and acquisition. The company scrambled to replace the revenues lost after the market for hard drive compression software collapsed with the inclusion of DoubleSpace in MS-DOS and the rapid decline in hard disk cost per megabyte. Using the funds from its IPO (1992) and the settlement with Microsoft, Stac acquired a remote desktop software product called "ReachOut". It acquired a server image backup product, "Replica", and internally developed a network backup product for workstations and laptops, and marketed this product first as "Replica NDM" and later as "eSupport Essentials". Much of the technology pioneered in Stac's network backup offering ultimately found its way into today's online backup solutions.

Meanwhile, Stac's original chip business continued to grow. In order to realize shareholder value, its chip subsidiary called Hifn, was spun off in 1998 in a primary public offering.

Stac then renamed the remaining utility software company to "Previo", and repositioned itself as a help desk and support organization tool provider. This effort was pursued while the dot-com bubble was bursting, and in 2002 management elected to take the unusual step of selling Stac's remaining technology assets (to Altiris) and returning its remaining cash to shareholders before dissolving.

== Controversy ==
=== Microsoft lawsuit ===
In 1993, Microsoft released MS-DOS 6.0, which included a disk compression utility called DoubleSpace. Prior to its release, Microsoft had engaged in discussions with Stac Electronics regarding a potential licensing agreement for its compression technology and had reviewed aspects of Stac's code during due diligence. Stac, in an effort led by attorney Morgan Chu, subsequently filed a lawsuit against Microsoft, alleging infringement of its data compression patents. Microsoft filed a counterclaim and sought an injunction to prevent the sale of Stac's Stacker 3.1 software. In 1994, a California jury found that Microsoft had infringed Stac's patents and awarded Stac $120 million in damages. The jury also found that Stac had misappropriated a Microsoft trade secret related to a pre-loading feature and awarded Microsoft $13.6 million on its counterclaim. Following the verdict, a preliminary injunction temporarily halted sales of certain MS-DOS versions containing DoubleSpace. Microsoft subsequently released an updated version of MS-DOS without the feature. Later that year, the companies reached a settlement. As part of the agreement, Microsoft invested approximately $39.9 million in Stac and agreed to pay additional royalties totaling about $43 million.

== See also ==
- Hifn
- Novell DOS 7, OpenDOS 7.01, DR-DOS 7.02 and higher
- PC DOS 7 and PC DOS 2000
- DOS Protected Mode Services
- Multimedia Stacker
- Disk compression
- File Allocation Table
- Comparison of file systems
