= DeviceLogics =

Defunct operating system company (DOS)

- Industry: Computer software
- Founded: November 2002; 24 years ago
- Founder: Bryan Sparks, Bryce Burns, Troy Tribe
- Headquarters: Lindon, Utah, United States
- Products: DR-DOS
- Website: www.drdos.com (dead since 2018)

DeviceLogics was a company in Lindon, Utah, USA, founded in November 2002. Originally doing business mostly under the DeviceLogics name, the company was incorporated as DRDOS, Inc. for legal reasons. The DeviceLogics name was later dropped.

Bryan Wayne Sparks co-founded the company, together with Bryce Burns and Troy Tribe, and acquired DR-DOS from the Canopy Group, a Utah technology venture group. Copies of DR-DOS 7.03 have been licensed and distributed by this company. The company's web site went offline in 2018.

== History of DR-DOS ==
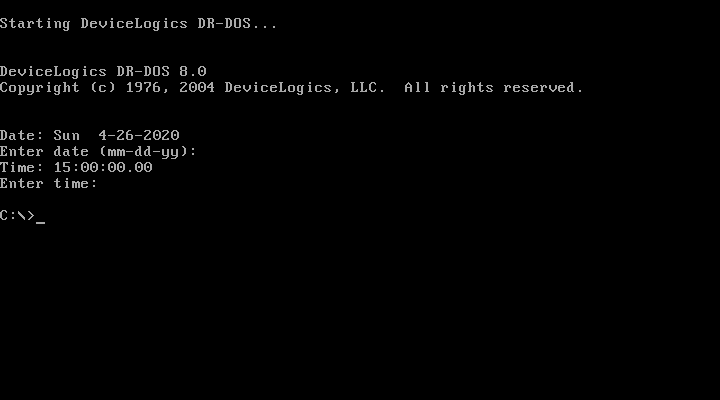
DeviceLogics DR-DOS 8.0

In 1994, Bryan W. Sparks, with help from Novell's Raymond John Noorda, founded Caldera, Inc. Caldera bought DR-DOS from Novell in 1996.

== See also ==
- Lineo
