= Ultracopier =

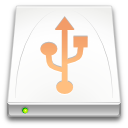

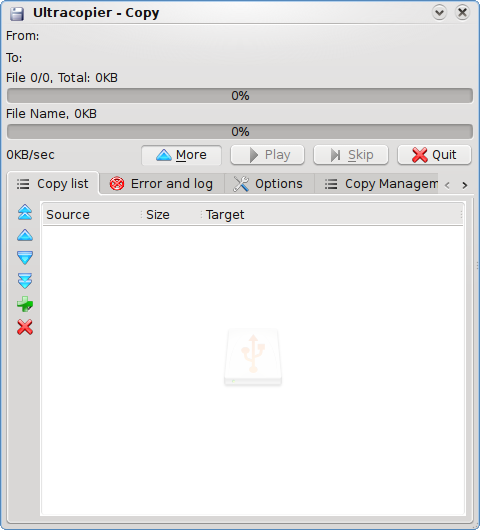
- Tool of file copy.
- Original author: alpha_one_x86
- Developers: GliGli (SuperCopier creator), Yogi (Original NT Copier), ZeuS, alpha_one_x86
- Initial release: March 29, 2009; 17 years ago
- Stable release: 3.0.2.1 / May 11, 2026; 17 days ago
- Written in: C++ and Qt
- Operating system: Windows 7+, macOS, Linux, BSD, Haiku OS
- Platform: IA-32, x64, and AArch64
- Available in: Multilingual
- Type: Utility software
- License: GNU GPLv3
- Website: ultracopier.herman-brule.com
- Repository: github.com/alphaonex86/Ultracopier

Ultracopier is file copying application software for Windows, macOS, and Linux. It is based on and supersedes SuperCopier. SuperCopier and Ultracopier differ mainly in terms of appearance. SuperCopier essentially serves as a skin for Ultracopier, with slightly higher CPU usage. SuperCopier typically refers to SuperCopier 3 and earlier versions, while Ultracopier refers to SuperCopier 4 and later versions, now known as Ultracopier 1.4.

Features include:

- Pause/resume transfers
- Dynamic speed limitation
- On-error resume
- Error/collision management
- Data security
- Intelligent reorganization of transfer to optimize performance
- Plugins

== Versions ==
The application is distributed in standard and ultimate variants:

- The underlying source code is identical across editions and is published under the same copyleft license.
- The ultimate variant bundles alternative optional interface and engine plugins.
- Both distributions operate without DRM (as explicit restrictions are prohibited by the GPLv3 license) and can be redistributed freely by users.

== Reception ==
Ultracopier has been covered and reviewed by several independent technical publications. In an extensive performance evaluation by gHacks, the software was noted for its customizable performance tweaks, granular copy-engine settings (such as strict retention of file rights and timestamps), and plugin extensibility, though real-world transfer throughput gains depended heavily on specific hardware and drive arrays.

Technology portal Gizmodo highlighted the application's unique advantage over default desktop environment dialogs when manipulating mass media directories or network storage pools, specifically praising its localized error-handling routines, which allow unassisted processing pipelines to bypass corrupted blocks or prompt user intervention instead of triggering a complete operation crash. Platform profiles on systems repositories like Slashdot similarly classify the utility as a highly configurable power-user alternative for managing dense cluster transfers or unassisted backup workflows.

== See also ==
- FastCopy
