= TeraCopy =

File transfer software

- Developer: Code Sector
- Release: 16 May 2007; 19 years ago
- Stable release: 4.0 / June 20, 2026; 2 months ago
- Operating system: Windows Vista and later Windows Server 2003 and later
- Platform: IA-32, x86-64, ARM
- Size: 15 MB
- Type: Utility software
- License: Freemium
- Website: codesector.com/teracopy

TeraCopy is a file transfer utility focused on data integrity, transfer reliability and the ability to pause and resume transfers. It dynamically adjusts buffers to reduce seek times and provides asynchronous copying to reduce overall transfer time between two storage media.

== History ==
In 2007, Ionut Ilascu from Softpedia.com commended the utility on its ability for its error recovery functionality and concluded "TeraCopy is a lot faster than Windows Explorer on XP is, but only with proper defragmentation. On Vista, it moves a tad slower even if defragmentation of the disk has been performed."

In 2009 Jason Fitzpatrick from Lifehacker praised the usability by stating "It doesn't overwhelm you with a plethora of settings or options" and also called it "just advanced enough." Subsequently, Lifehacker visitors voted TeraCopy by a large margin as the best Windows file copier out of four other contestants.

In a 2010 review, CNET called it a "nifty piece of freeware" and recommended it for all Windows users.

== Description ==
In case of a transfer error, the utility re-tries multiple times. Eventually, it skips the file and continues processing other files. TeraCopy shows failed file transfers and allows the user to retry failed operations. Since feedback about a failed transfer is limited to simply "Skipped", a user may struggle to fix the problem. With more detailed information (i.e. file name too long) the user might be able to better recover.

The utility is designed to run as an application or integrated in Windows Explorer to replace its copy and move functions. The author asserts that it has full Unicode support.

The utility is licensed as freemium. A basic edition is offered as freeware that is restricted to a non-commercial environment. TeraCopy Pro, a shareware version of the utility, adds additional features such as a list of favorite folders for copy destination and the ability to modify the copy queue.

== See also ==
- File copying
