= Edlin =

Line-oriented text editor

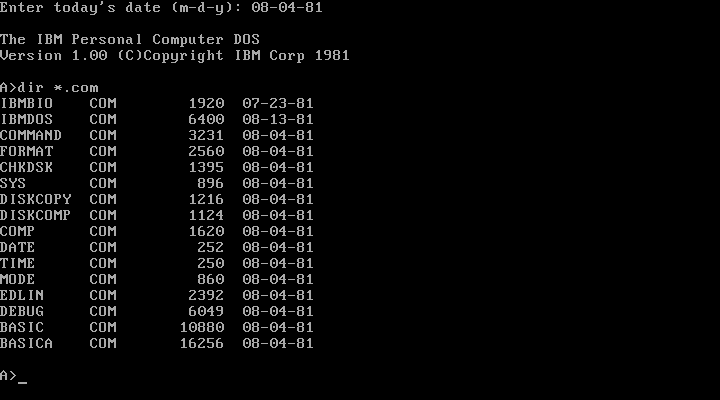
- EDLIN.COM (among several other commands) in IBM PC DOS 1.0
- Original author: Tim Paterson
- Developers: Microsoft, IBM, Gregory Pietsch
- Release: 1980; 46 years ago
- Written in: MS-DOS: x86 assembly language
- Operating system: 86-DOS, IBM PC DOS, MS-DOS, FreeDOS, OS/2, eComStation, ArcaOS, Windows
- Successor: MS-DOS Editor
- Type: Line editor
- License: MS-DOS: MIT; FreeDOS, ReactOS: GPL; 86-DOS, PC DOS, OS/2, Windows: Proprietary commercial software
- Website: Edlin
- Repository: github.com/microsoft/MS-DOS/blob/main/v2.0/source/EDLIN.ASM

Edlin is a line editor, and the only text editor provided with early versions of IBM PC DOS, MS DOS and OS/2. Although superseded in MS-DOS 5.0 and later by the full screen MS DOS Editor, and by Notepad in Microsoft Windows, it continued to be included in the 32 bit versions of Microsoft operating systems up to Windows Server 2008 and Windows 10. While Edlin itself was discontinued with the death of 32 bit Windows, Microsoft later revived the concept of a terminal focused editor in 2025 by releasing an open-source, modern command line editor called "Edit" for Windows 11.

== History ==
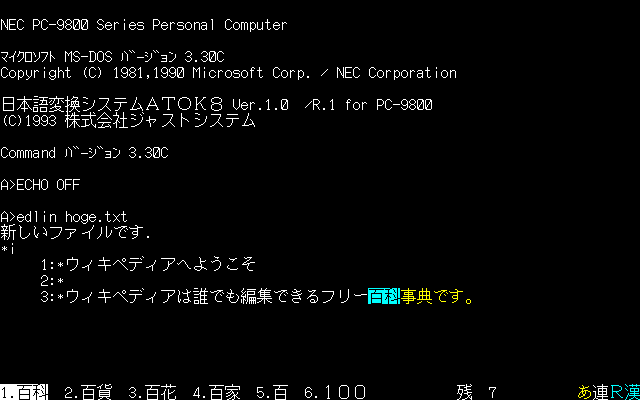
Using EDLIN for typing Japanese with the ATOK 8 input method editor, running on MS-DOS 3.3C for the PC-9800 series

Edlin was created by Tim Paterson in two weeks in 1980, for Seattle Computer Products's 86-DOS (QDOS) based on the CP/M context editor ED, itself distantly inspired by the DEC PDP-10 TOPS-10 EDIT text editor.

Microsoft acquired 86-DOS and, after some further development, sold it as MS-DOS, so Edlin was included in v1.0–v6.22 of MS-DOS. From MS-DOS 5 onward, the main editor included was the new full-screen MS-DOS Editor. On some distributions of 6.22, EDLIN was found on the supplementary tools disk instead of being installed by default.

Windows 95, 98 and ME ran on top of an embedded version of DOS, which reports itself as MS-DOS 7.

Edlin is included in the 32-bit versions of Windows NT and its derivatives—up to and including Windows 10—because the NTVDM's DOS support in those operating systems is based on MS-DOS version 5.0. However, unlike most other external DOS commands, it has not been transformed into a native Win32 program. It also does not support long filenames, which were not added to MS-DOS and Windows until long after Edlin was written.

The FreeDOS version was developed by Gregory Pietsch.

== Usage ==
To start ediln from the DOS prompt, one would type the command edlin followed by the filename to be opened or created. Once the edilin prompt * appears. there are only a few commands for editing and a short listing of them can be seen by entering a ? at the edlin prompt.

L
Lists (displays) lines of text. (e.g., 1,6L lists lines 1 through 6). Each line is displayed with a line number in front of it.

 *1,6L
        1: Edlin: The only text editor in early versions of DOS.
        2:
        3: Back in the day, I remember seeing web pages
        4: branded with a logo at the bottom:
        5: "This page created in edlin."
        6: The things that some people put themselves through. ;-)
 *

The currently selected line has an *. To replace the contents of any line, the line number is entered and any text entered replaces the original. While editing a line pressing Ctrl+C cancels any changes. The * marker remains on that line.
I
Inserts one or more lines before the * line or the line number given. For example, 3i inserts a blank line before what was line 3 of the file, and i alone inserts at the currently selected line. To insert lines after the end of a document, use the Insert command and either specify a line number larger than the last line, or use the last line symbol # in #i. When finished entering lines, Ctrl+C returns to the edlin command prompt.

 *6I
        6:*(...or similar)
        7:*^C 
  
 *7D
 *L
        1: Edlin: The only text editor in early versions of DOS.
        2:
        3: Back in the day, I remember seeing web pages
        4: branded with a logo at the bottom:
        5: "This page created in edlin."
        6: (...or similar)
 *

D
Delete a specified line or a range of lines. e.g.: 2,4d deletes lines 2 through 4. In the above example, line 7 was deleted.
R
Replace all occurrences of a piece of text in a given range of lines, for example, to replace a spelling error. Including the ? prompts for each change. E.g.: To replace 'prit' with 'print' and to prompt for each change: ?rprit^Zprint (the ^Z represents pressing CTRL+Z). It is case-sensitive.
S
Searches for given text. It is used in the same way as replace, but without the replacement text. A search for 'apple' in the first 20 lines of a file is typed 1,20?sapple (no space, unless that is part of the search) followed by a press of enter. For each match, it asks if it is the correct one, and accepts n or y (or Enter).
P
Page displays starting from a specified line. If no line number is given, the line after the current line and the following 22 lines. The Page command changes the current line to the last line displayed, so one can page through a file by typing p for each screenful.
T
Transfers another file into the one being edited, with this syntax: [line to insert at]t[full path to file]. e.g. 5tb:addresses will transfer a file on the b drive named addresses to just before line 5. The file content is taken from is not altered.
W
Write (save) the file.
E
Ends the editing session, saves the file and quits edlin.
Q
Quits edlin without saving.
M
Move a range of lines to before a specified line in the file. e.g. 5,12,26m moves lines 5 through 12 to just before line 26.
C
Copy a range of lines to a specified line in the file one or more times. e.g. 18,24,#c Copies lines 18 through 24 to the # end of the document. 1,1,25,5c Copies lines 1 through 1 (just the first line) to just before line 25 and does so five times. Copy differs from Move in that the range you specify remains in its original location and is repeated in the new location.

=== Scripts ===
Edlin may be used as a non-interactive file editor in scripts by redirecting a series of edlin commands.

edlin < script

=== FreeDOS Edlin ===
A GPL-licensed clone of Edlin that includes long filename support is available for download as part of the FreeDOS project. This runs on operating systems such as Linux or Unix as well as MS-DOS.

== See also ==
- List of DOS commands
- ed and ex, similar Unix line editors.
- 86-DOS
