= Tao ExDOS =

MS-DOS emulator for Windows

- Developer: Tao Software Development Company
- Stable release: 10.0.480 / November 5, 2020; 4 years ago
- Written in: C++, Assembler, Visual Basic
- Operating system: Windows 10; Windows 8; Windows 7; Windows Vista; Windows XP; Windows 2000; Windows Server 2008; Windows Server 2003
- Type: Emulator
- License: Commercial EULA
- Website: www.taosdc.com

Tao ExDOS is an MS-DOS emulator that runs on Windows. It supports running programs that are otherwise inaccessible since hardware for running a compatible disk operating system (DOS) is obsolete and generally unavailable today.

The emulator enables the DOS and running 16-bit Windows applications (that run under DOS) via a built-in Virtual 8086 mode of the x86 CPU on Windows 10/8/7/Vista/XP/2000 and Windows Terminal Server 2003/2008. Support for 64-bit systems is available on Windows 7 via the Virtual XP Mode, which can be downloaded for free from Microsoft for Windows 7 Professional, Ultimate and Enterprise versions.

Printer support allows for printing to USB-connected printers, network printers, fax printers, PDF, Microsoft Word, HTML and image files.

== See also ==
- DOSBox – Free MS-DOS emulator
