= Microsoft ScanDisk =

Disk diagnostic utility for MS-DOS and Windows 9x

- Text-based version of Microsoft ScanDisk running on Windows 98
- Other names: ScanDisk
- Developer(s): Microsoft
- Initial release: 1993; 32 years ago
- Operating system: MS-DOS 6.2 and Windows 9x
- Type: Utility software
- License: Proprietary commercial software

Microsoft ScanDisk (also called ScanDisk) is a diagnostic utility program included in MS-DOS and Windows 9x. It checks and repairs file systems errors on a disk drive, while the system starts.

== Overview ==
The program was first introduced in MS-DOS 6.2 and succeeded its simpler predecessor, CHKDSK. It included a more user-friendly interface than CHKDSK, more configuration options, and the ability to detect and (if possible) recover from physical errors on the disk. This replaced and improved upon the limited ability offered by the MS-DOS recover utility. Unlike CHKDSK, ScanDisk would also repair crosslinked files.

In Windows 95 onwards, ScanDisk also had a graphical user interface, although the text-based user interface continued to be available for use in single-tasking ("DOS") mode.

However, ScanDisk cannot check NTFS disk drives, and therefore it is unavailable for computers that may be running NT based (including Windows 2000, Windows XP, etc.) versions of Windows; for the purpose, a newer CHKDSK is provided instead.

On Unix-like systems, there are tools like fsck_msdosfs and dosfsck to do the same task.

== See also ==
- fsck
- List of DOS commands
