= MS-DOS =

Microsoft computer operating system

- The command-line interface, showing that the current directory is the root of drive C
- Developer: Microsoft
- Written in: x86 assembly, later versions also used C
- OS family: DOS
- Working state: Preserved pieces exist in 32-bit Windows
- Source model: Closed source; Partially open source for versions 1.25, 2.11 and 4.00
- Initial release: August 1981; 45 years ago
- Final release: 8.0 (Windows Me) / September 14, 2000; 26 years ago
- Repository: github.com/microsoft/MS-DOS
- Available in: English
- Update method: Re-installation
- Package manager: None
- Supported platforms: x86
- Kernel type: Monolithic
- Influenced by: TOPS-10, CP/M
- Default user interface: Command-line (COMMAND.COM), text (DOS Shell)
- License: Proprietary; MIT License (v1.25, v2.0 & v4.00)
- Preceded by: 86-DOS
- Succeeded by: Windows NT (since Windows XP)
- Official website: Internet Archive MS-DOS overview

Support status
- MS-DOS versions 1.x-7.0 unsupported as of December 31, 2001 MS-DOS versions 7.10 and 8.0 unsupported as of July 11, 2006.

MS-DOS (/ˌɛmˌɛsˈdɒs/ em-ess-DOSS; acronym for Microsoft Disk Operating System, also known as Microsoft DOS) is an operating system for x86-based personal computers mostly developed by Microsoft. Collectively, MS-DOS, its alternate branding as IBM PC DOS, and a few operating systems attempting to be compatible with MS-DOS, are sometimes referred to as "DOS" (which is also the generic acronym for disk operating system). MS-DOS was the main operating system for IBM PC compatibles during the 1980s, from which point it was gradually superseded by operating systems offering a graphical user interface (GUI), in various generations of the graphical Microsoft Windows operating system.

IBM licensed and released it in 1981 as PC DOS 1.0 for use in its IBM Personal Computer. Although MS-DOS and PC DOS were initially developed in parallel by Microsoft and IBM, the two products diverged after twelve years, in 1993, with recognizable differences in compatibility, syntax and capabilities. Beginning in 1988 with DR-DOS, several competing products were released for the x86 platform.

Initially, MS-DOS was targeted at Intel 8086 processors running on computer hardware using floppy disks to store and access not only the operating system, but application software and user data as well. Progressive version releases delivered support for other mass storage media in ever greater sizes and formats, along with added feature support for newer processors and rapidly evolving computer architectures. Ultimately, it was the key product in Microsoft's development from a programming language company to a diverse software development firm, providing the company with essential revenue and marketing resources. It was also the underlying basic operating system on which early versions of Windows ran as a GUI. MS-DOS went through eight versions, until development ceased in 2000; version 6.22 from 1994 was the final standalone version, with versions 7 and 8 serving mostly in the background for loading Windows 9x.

The command interpreter, COMMAND.COM, runs when no application program is running. When an application exits, the interpreter resumes – loaded back into memory by the DOS if it was purged by the application. A command is processed by matching input text with either a built-in command or an executable file located on the current drive and along the command path. A command with significant program size or used infrequently tended to be a separate file in order to limit the size of the command processor program.

== History ==
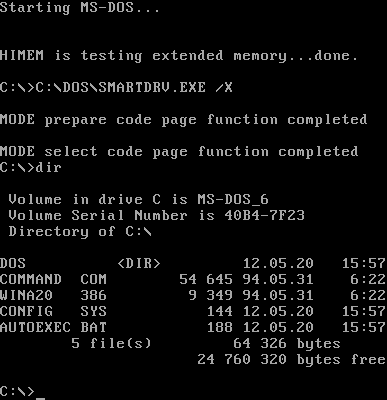
MS-DOS command prompt

MS-DOS began as a renamed version of 86-DOS, a disk operating system owned by Seattle Computer Products and written by Tim Paterson. Development of 86-DOS took only six weeks, as it was basically a clone of Digital Research's CP/M (for 8080/Z80 processors) ported to the Intel 8086. It had two notable differences from CP/M: an improved disk sector buffering logic and FAT12 instead of the CP/M filesystem. This first version was shipped in August 1980. Microsoft, which needed an operating system for the IBM Personal Computer, hired Tim Paterson in May 1981 and bought 86-DOS 1.10 for US$25,000 that July. Microsoft kept the version number, but renamed it MS-DOS. They also licensed MS-DOS 1.10/1.14 to IBM, which, in August 1981, offered it as PC DOS 1.0 as one of three operating systems for the IBM 5150 or the IBM PC.

Within a year, Microsoft licensed MS-DOS to over 70 other companies. It was designed to be an OS that could run on any 8086-family computer. Each computer would have its own distinct hardware and its own version of MS-DOS, similar to the situation that existed for CP/M, and with MS-DOS emulating the same solution as CP/M to adapt for different hardware platforms. To this end, MS-DOS was designed with a modular structure with internal device drivers (the DOS BIOS), minimally for primary disk drives and the console, integrated with the kernel and loaded by the boot loader, and installable device drivers for other devices loaded and integrated at boot time. The OEM would use a development kit provided by Microsoft to build a version of MS-DOS with their basic I/O drivers and a standard Microsoft kernel, which they would typically supply on disk to end users along with the hardware. Thus, there were many different versions of "MS-DOS" for different hardware, and there is a major distinction between an IBM-compatible (or ISA) machine and an MS-DOS [compatible] machine. Some machines, like the Tandy 2000, were MS-DOS compatible but not IBM-compatible, so they could run software written exclusively for MS-DOS without dependence on the peripheral hardware of the IBM PC architecture.

This design would have worked well for compatibility, if application programs had used only MS-DOS services to perform device I/O. Indeed, the same design philosophy is embodied in Windows NT (see Hardware Abstraction Layer). However, in MS-DOS's early days, the greater speed attainable by programs through direct control of hardware was of particular importance, especially for games, which often pushed the limits of their contemporary hardware. Very soon an IBM-compatible architecture became the goal, and before long all 8086-family computers closely emulated IBM's hardware, and only a single version of MS-DOS for a fixed hardware platform was needed for the market. This version is the version of MS-DOS that is discussed here, as the dozens of other OEM versions of "MS-DOS" were only relevant to the systems for which they were designed, and in any case were very similar in function and capability to some standard version for the IBM PC—often the same-numbered version, but not always, since some OEMs used their own proprietary version numbering schemes (e.g. labeling later releases of MS-DOS 1.x as 2.0 or vice versa)—with a few notable exceptions.

Microsoft omitted multi-user support from MS-DOS because Microsoft's Unix-based operating system, Xenix, was fully multi-user. The company planned, over time, to improve MS-DOS so it would be almost indistinguishable from single-user Xenix, or XEDOS, which would also run on the Motorola 68000, Zilog Z8000, and the LSI-11; they would be upwardly compatible with Xenix, which Byte in 1983 described as "the multi-user MS-DOS of the future". Microsoft advertised MS-DOS and Xenix together, listing the shared features of its "single-user OS" and "the multi-user, multi-tasking, UNIX-derived operating system", and promising easy porting between them. After the breakup of the Bell System, however, AT&T Computer Systems started selling UNIX System V. Believing that it could not compete with AT&T in the Unix market, Microsoft abandoned Xenix, and in 1987 transferred ownership of Xenix to the Santa Cruz Operation (SCO).

On March 25, 2014, Microsoft made partial source code (including sourceless binaries) to SCP MS-DOS 1.25 and a mixture of Altos MS-DOS 2.11 and TeleVideo PC DOS 2.11 available to the public under the Microsoft Research License Agreement, which made the partial sources source-available, but not open source as defined by Open Source Initiative or free software by Free Software Foundation standards. Microsoft would later re-license the partial sources and sourceless binaries under the MIT License on September 28, 2018, making these versions partially open source. Microsoft later released partial source code and sourceless binaries for MS-DOS 4.00 on April 25, 2024, under the same license.

As an April Fool's Day joke in 2015, Microsoft Mobile launched a Windows Phone application called MS-DOS Mobile which was presented as a new mobile operating system and worked similar to MS-DOS.

== Versions ==
Microsoft licensed or released versions of MS-DOS under different names like Lifeboat Associates "Software Bus 86" a.k.a. SB-DOS, COMPAQ-DOS, NCR-DOS or Z-DOS before it eventually enforced the MS-DOS name for all versions but the IBM one, which was originally called "IBM Personal Computer DOS", later shortened to IBM PC DOS. (Competitors released compatible DOS systems such as DR-DOS and PTS-DOS that could also run MS-DOS applications.)

In the former Eastern bloc, MS-DOS derivatives named DCP (Disk Control Program) 3.20 and 3.30 (DCP 1700, DCP 3.3) and WDOS existed in the late 1980s. They were produced by the East German electronics manufacturer VEB Robotron.

The following versions of MS-DOS were released to the public:

=== MS-DOS 1.x ===
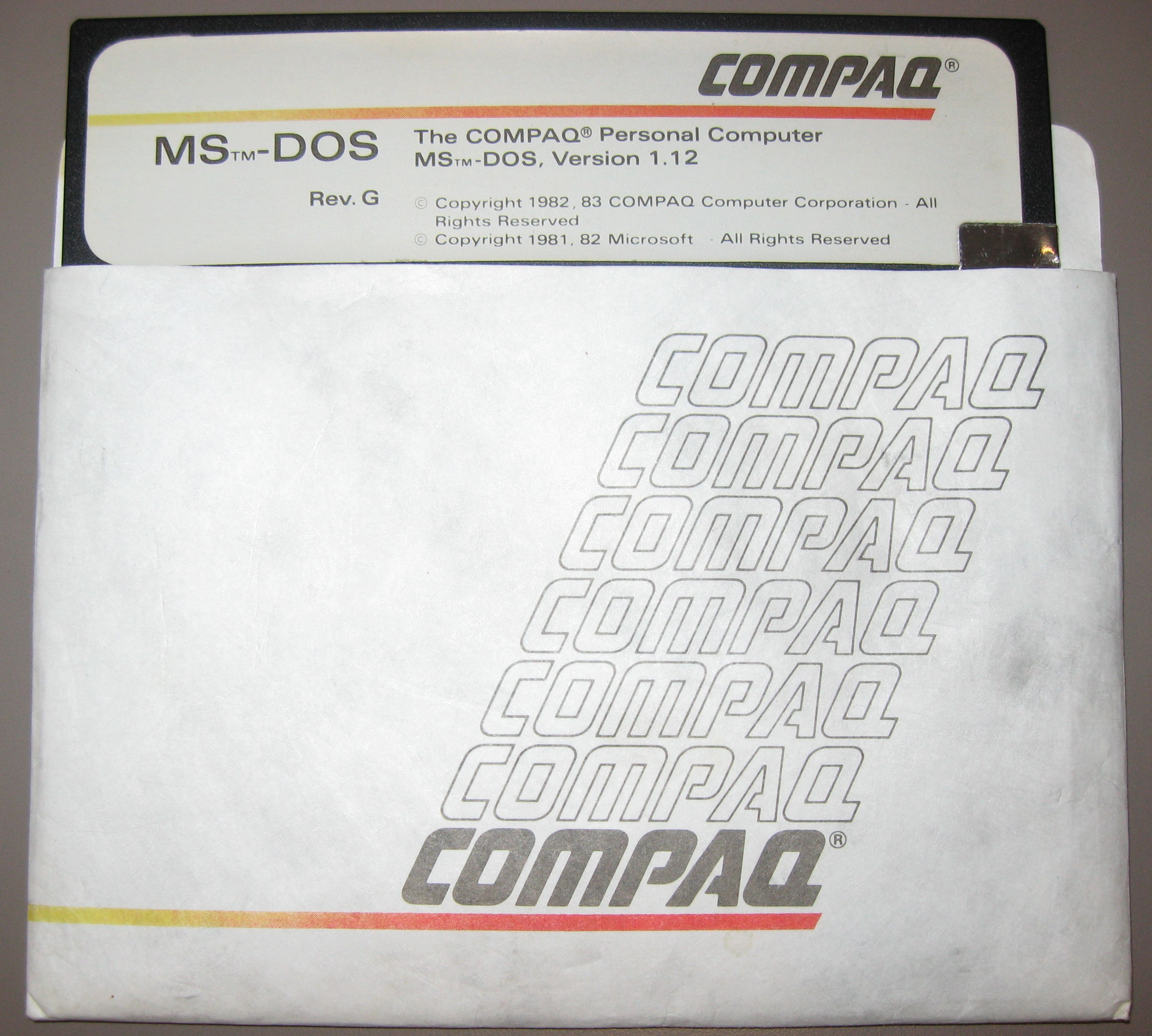
MS-DOS (Compaq-DOS) version 1.12 (based on MS-DOS 1.25) for Compaq Personal Computer

- Version 1.23 (OEM)
- Version 1.24 (OEM) – basis for IBM's Personal Computer DOS 1.1
- Version 1.25 (OEM) – basis for non-IBM OEM versions of MS-DOS, including SCP MS-DOS 1.25

- Compaq-DOS 1.12, a Compaq OEM version of MS-DOS 1.25; Release date: November 1983
- TI BOOT V. 1.13, a Texas Instruments OEM version of MS-DOS; Release date: August 1983
- Zenith Z-DOS 1.19, a Zenith OEM version of MS-DOS 1.25
- Zenith Z-DOS/MS-DOS release 1.01, version 1.25, a Zenith OEM version of MS-DOS; Release date: May 1983

=== MS-DOS 2.x ===
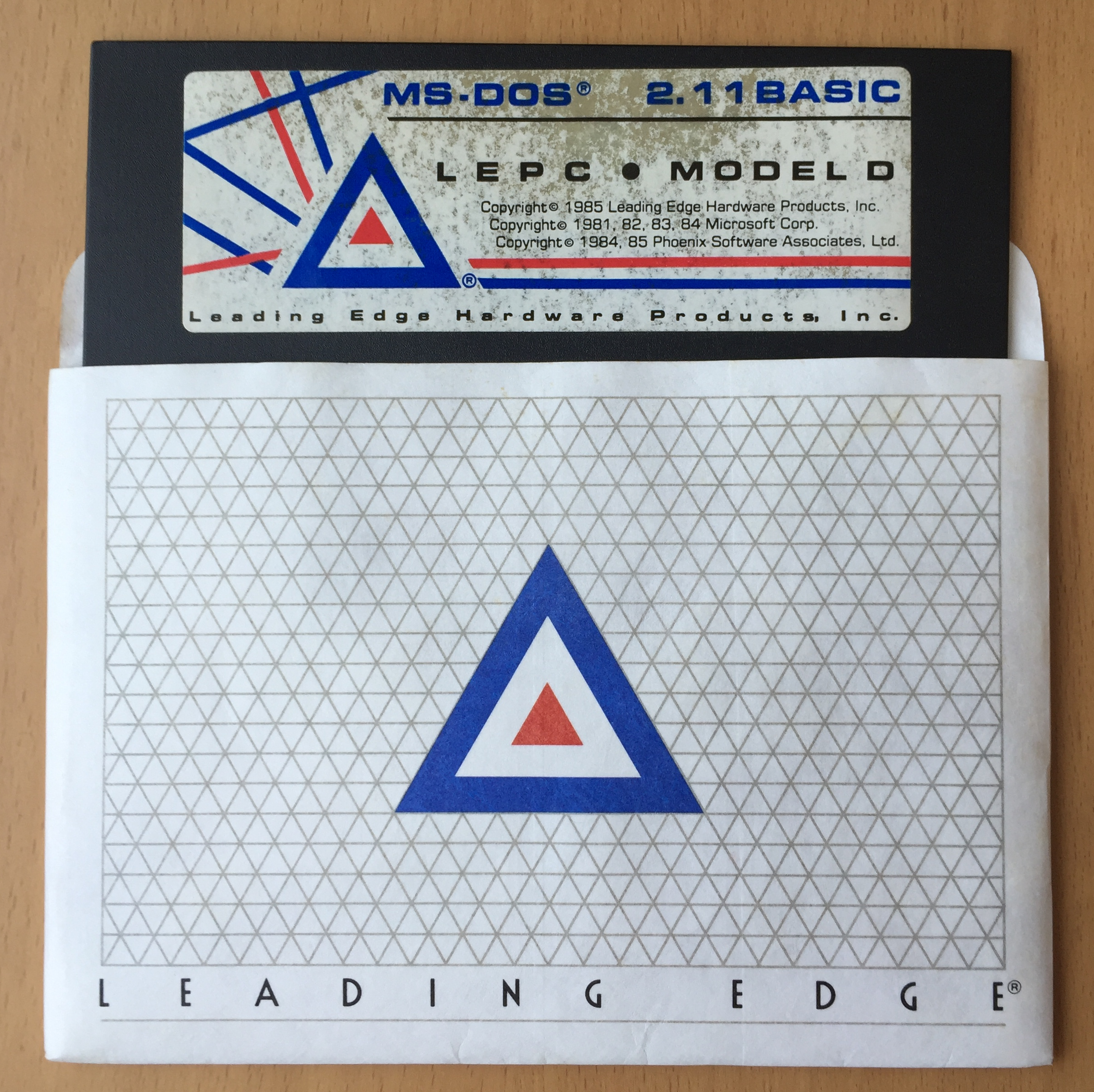
MS-DOS 2.11 boot disk for the Leading Edge Model D in its sleeve

MS-DOS 2.x became popular because of reliability and use of less memory than version 3. Support for IBM's XT 10 MB hard disk drives, support up to 16 MB or 32 MB FAT12-formatted hard disk drives depending on the formatting tool shipped by OEMs, user-installable device drivers, tree-structure filing system, Unix-like inheritable redirectable file handles, non-multitasking child processes, an improved Terminate and Stay Resident (TSR) API, environment variables, device driver support, FOR and GOTO loops in batch files, ANSI.SYS.

- Version 2.0 (OEM), First version to support double-sided 360 KB 5.25-inch floppy disks; Release date: October 1983
- Version 2.02 (OEM, Compaq); Release date: November 1983
- Version 2.05 (OEM, international support); Release date: October 1983
- Version 2.1 (OEM, IBM only)
- Version 2.11 (OEM)
  - Altos MS-DOS 2.11, an Altos OEM version of MS-DOS 2.11 for the ACT-86C
  - ITT Corporation ITT-DOS 2.11 Version 2 (MS-DOS 2.11 for the ITT XTRA Personal Computer); Release date: July 1985
  - Olivetti M19 came with MS-DOS 2.11
  - Tandy 1000 HX has MS-DOS 2.11 in ROM
  - TeleVideo PC DOS 2.11, a TeleVideo OEM version of MS-DOS 2.11
  - Toshiba MS-DOS 2.11 in ROM drive for the model T1000 laptop
- Version 2.13 (OEM, Zenith); Release date: July 1984
- Version 2.2 (OEM, with Hangeul support)
- Version 2.25 (OEM, with Hangeul and Kanji support)
- Version 2.3 (used on the Toshiba Pasopia 16)

=== MS-DOS 3.x ===
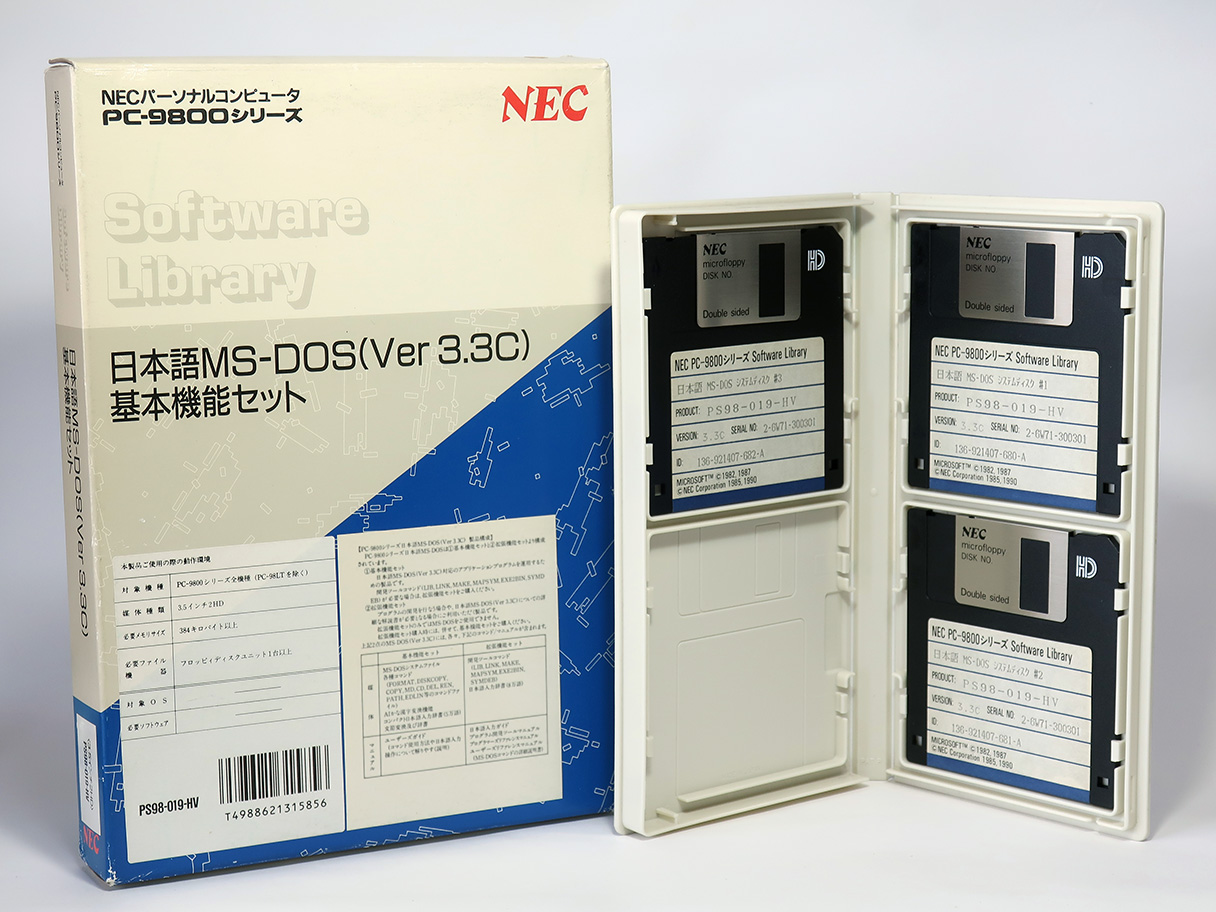
MS-DOS 3.3C for the PC-9800 series

- Version 3.0 (OEM) – First version to support 5.25-inch 1.2 MB floppy drives and diskettes, FAT16 partitions up to 32 MB; Release date: April 1985
- Version 3.1 (OEM) – Support for Microsoft Networks through an IFS layer, remote file and printer API
- Version 3.2 (OEM) – First version to support 3.5-inch 720 KB floppy drives and diskettes and XCOPY.
- Version 3.10 (OEM, Multitech); Release date: May 1986
- Version 3.20 – First retail release (non-OEM); Release date: July 1986
- Version 3.21 (OEM / non-OEM); Release date: May 1987
- Version 3.22 (OEM) – (HP 95LX)
- Version 3.3 (OEM) – First version to support 3.5-inch 1.44 MB floppy drives and diskettes, extended and logical partitions, directory tree copying with XCOPY, improved support for internationalization (COUNTRY.SYS), networked file flush operations
- Version 3.3a (OEM)
- Version 3.30; Release date: February 1988
- Version 3.30A (OEM, DTK); Release date: July 1987
- Version 3.30T (OEM, Tandy); Release date: July 1990
- Version 3.31 (Compaq, Emerson, and Vendex HeadStart Explorer OEM only) (Note: Confirmed that there was Compaq Personal Computer DOS 3.31 aside from MS-DOS 3.31.) – supports FAT16B with partitions larger than 32 MiB; (Note: Up to 512 MiB only.) Release date: November 1987

=== MS-DOS 4.0 / MS-DOS 4.x ===
- MS-DOS 4.0 and 4.1 – A separate branch of development with additional multitasking features, released between 3.2 and 3.3, and later abandoned. It is unrelated to any later versions, including versions 4.00 and 4.01 listed below
- MS-DOS 4.x (IBM-developed) – Includes a graphical/mouse interface. It had many bugs and compatibility issues that plagued all versions of MS-DOS 4.x.
  - Version 4.00 (OEM) – First version with built-in IBM/Microsoft support for hard disk partitions larger than 32 MB and up to a maximum size of 2 GB, FASTOPEN/FASTSEEK, DOSSHELL, could use EMS for the disk buffers and provided EMS drivers and emulation for 386-compatible processors; Release date: October 1988
  - Version 4.01 (OEM) – Microsoft-rewritten Version 4.00 released under MS-DOS label but not IBM PC DOS. First version to introduce volume serial number when formatting hard disks and floppy disks (Disk duplication also (Note: Only if boot record of source floppy disk contains volume serial number also.) and when using SYS to make a floppy disk or a hard drive partition bootable); Release date: April 1989
  - Version 4.01a (OEM)

=== MS-DOS 5.x ===
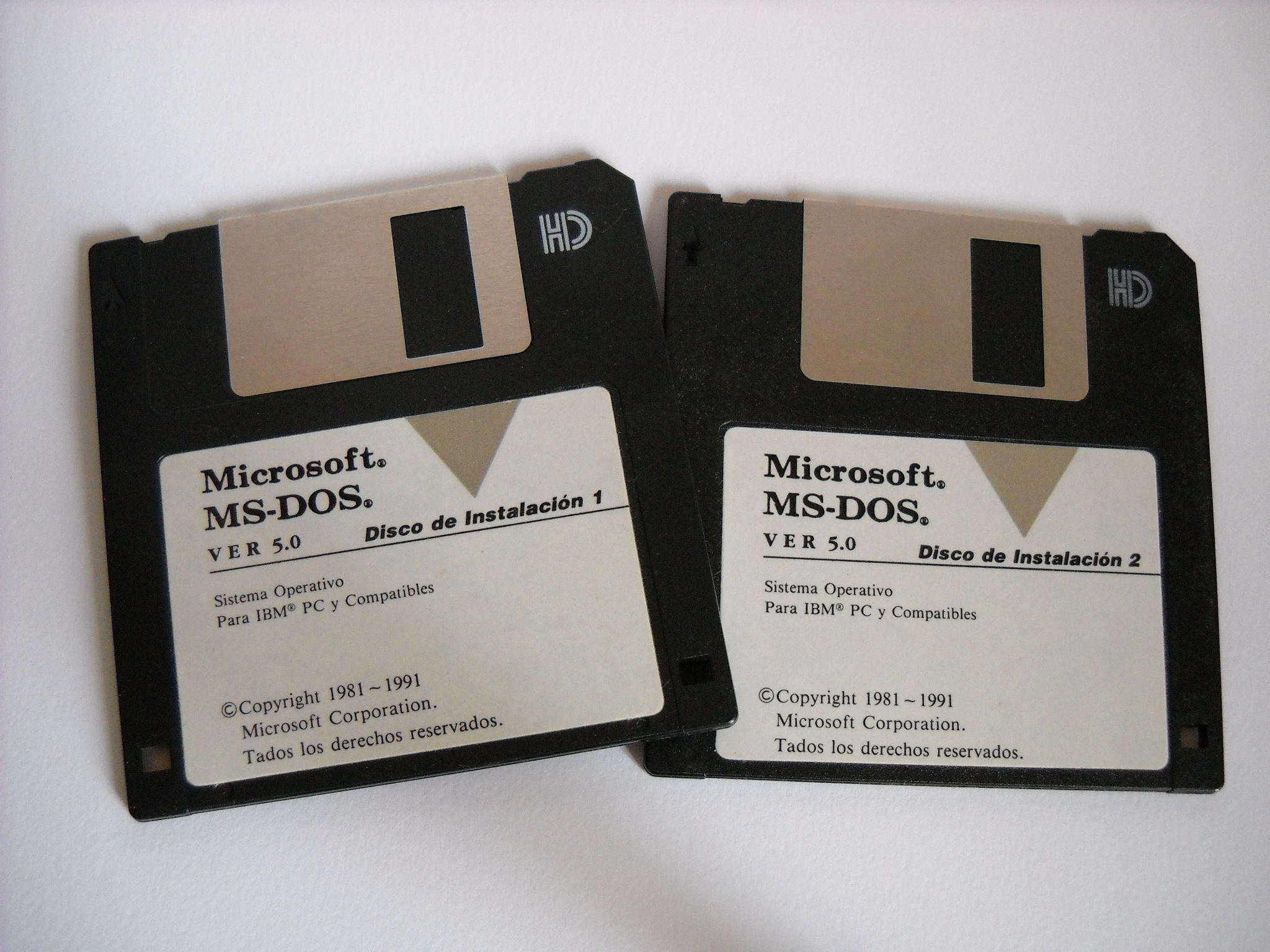
MS-DOS version 5.0

- Version 5.0 (Retail) – includes a full-screen text editor. Many of the bugs and compatibility issues from MS-DOS 4.x are resolved. First version to support 3.5-inch 2.88 MB floppy drives and diskettes. The SHARE command was not needed anymore for old DOS 1.x style FCB file API to partitions over 32 MB. First version to get the HIMEM.SYS driver and load portions of the operating system into the upper memory area and high memory area. Supports up to four DOS primary partitions, however FDISK cannot create more than one primary partition. Third-party tools allowed for the creation of up to four primary partitions.
  - AST Premium Exec DOS 5.0 (OEM) – a version for the AST Premium Exec series of notebooks with various extensions, including improved load-high and extended codepage support
- Version 5.0a (Retail) – With this release, IBM and Microsoft versions diverge.
- Version 5.50 (Windows NTVDM) – All Windows NT 32-bit versions ship with files from DOS 5.0

=== MS-DOS 6.x ===
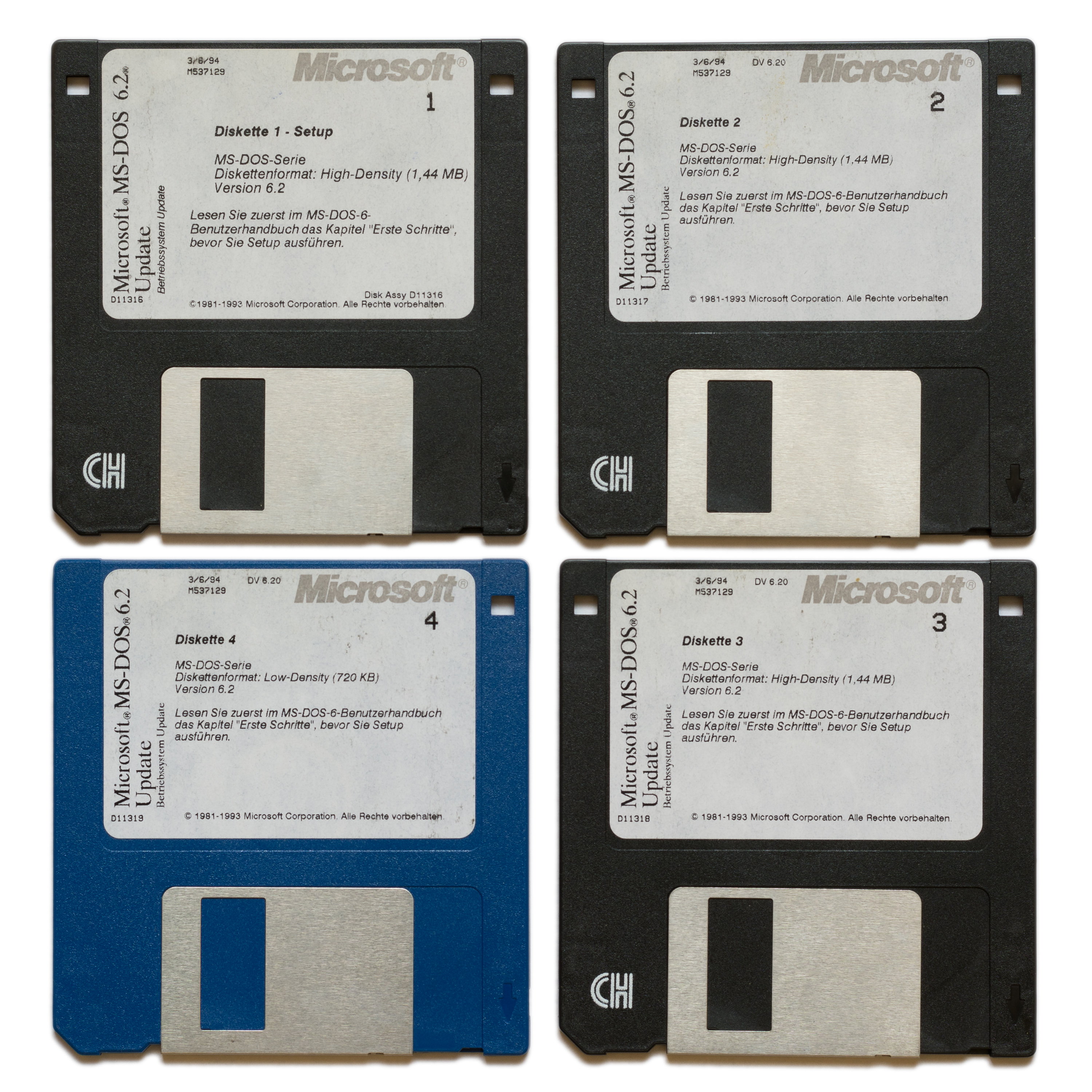
German MS-DOS 6.2 Update

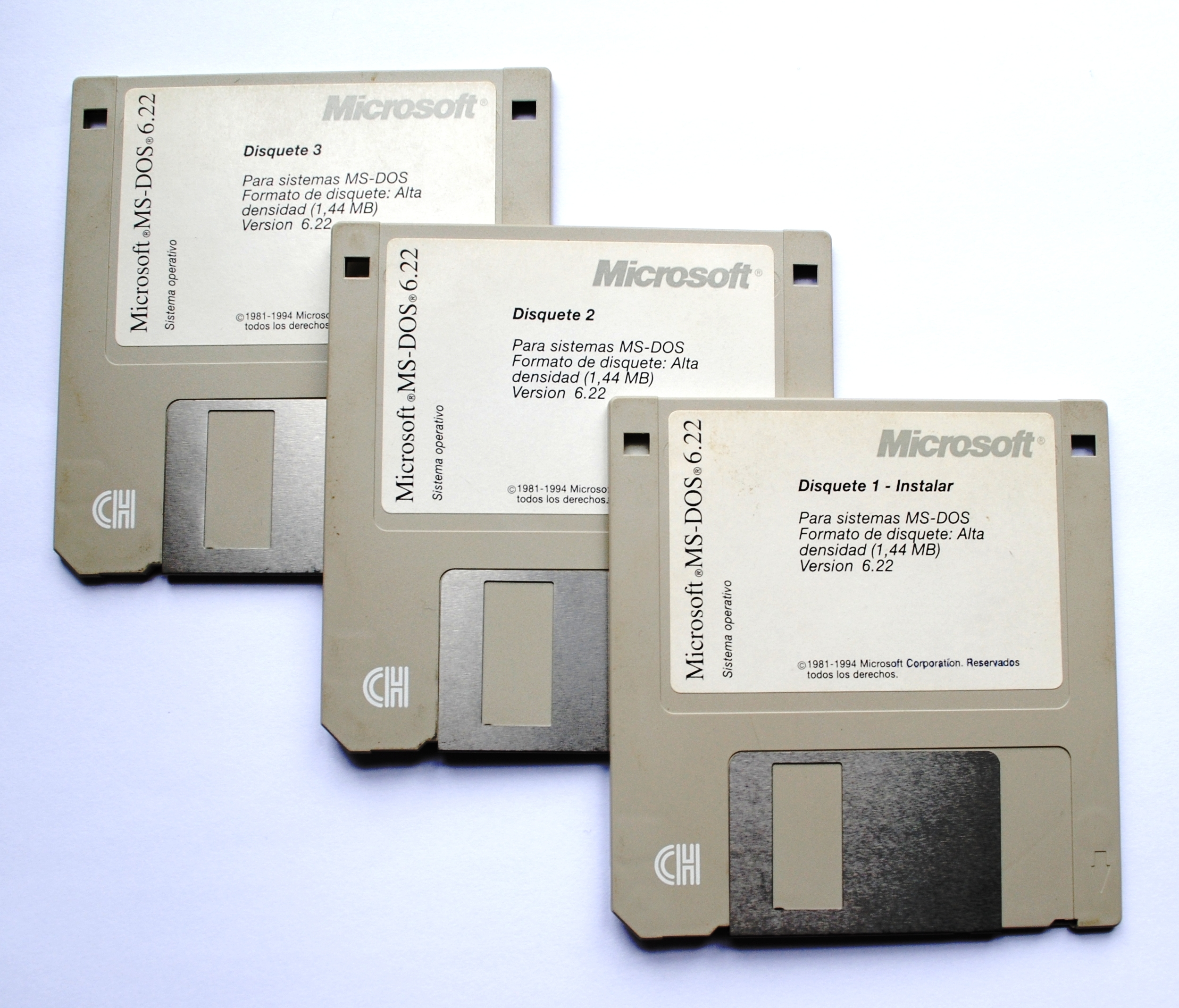
MS-DOS version 6.22

- Version 6.0 (Retail) – Online help through QBasic. Disk compression, upper memory optimization and antivirus included.
- Version 6.2 – SCANDISK as replacement for CHKDSK. Fix serious bugs in DBLSPACE.
- Version 6.21 (Retail) – Stacker-infringing DBLSPACE removed.
- Version 6.22 (Retail) – New DRVSPACE compression. Last version of MS-DOS to be sold as an independent product.

=== MS-DOS 7/8 (as part of Windows 9x) ===
- MS-DOS 7.0 was included in Windows 95's first retail release. It contains support for VFAT long file names when run in a Windows Virtual 8086 system, or with an LFN driver such as DOSLFN. JO.SYS is an alternative filename of the IO.SYS kernel file and used as such for "special purposes". JO.SYS allows booting from either CD-ROM drive or hard disk. Last version to recognize only the first 8.4 GB of a hard disk. The VER internal command reports the Windows version 4.00.950, applications through the MS-DOS API would be reported a version number of 7.00.
- MS-DOS 7.1 was included in Windows 95's OEM Service Release 2 through Windows 98 Second Edition. It added support for the FAT32 file system and logical block addressing (LBA), and was the last version that could boot to the command line from a hard disk. The VER internal command reports the Windows version 4.00.1111, 4.10.1998, or 4.10.2222 depending on the version of Windows, while applications through the API would report version 7.10.
- MS-DOS 8.0 was included in Windows Me, the last version based on MS-DOS. DOS mode was significantly altered in this release. Booting from the hard disk to a command line only was no longer permitted, AUTOEXEC.BAT and CONFIG.SYS files were no longer loaded or parsed before loading the Windows GUI; booting from floppy disk was still permitted to allow for emergency recovery. This version was included (in modified form) in Windows XP up to Windows 8.1 for creating MS-DOS startup disks. The VER internal command reports the Windows version 4.90.3000 or 5.1 when created from newer versions of Windows. Applications requesting the version through the API would report version 8.00.

Microsoft DOS was released through the OEM channel, until Digital Research released DR-DOS 5.0 as a retail upgrade. With PC DOS 5.00.1, the IBM–Microsoft agreement started to end, and IBM entered the retail DOS market with IBM DOS 5.00.1, 5.02, 6.00 and PC DOS 6.1, 6.3, 7, 2000 and 7.1.

=== Localized versions ===
Localized versions of MS-DOS existed for different markets. While Western issues of MS-DOS evolved around the same set of tools and drivers just with localized message languages and differing sets of supported codepages and keyboard layouts, some language versions were considerably different from Western issues and were adapted to run on localized PC hardware with additional BIOS services not available in Western PCs, support multiple hardware codepages for displays and printers, support DBCS, alternative input methods and graphics output. Affected issues include Japanese (DOS/V), Korean, Arabic (ADOS 3.3/5.0), Hebrew (HDOS 3.3/5.0), Russian (RDOS 4.01/5.0) as well as some other Eastern European versions of DOS.

== Competition ==
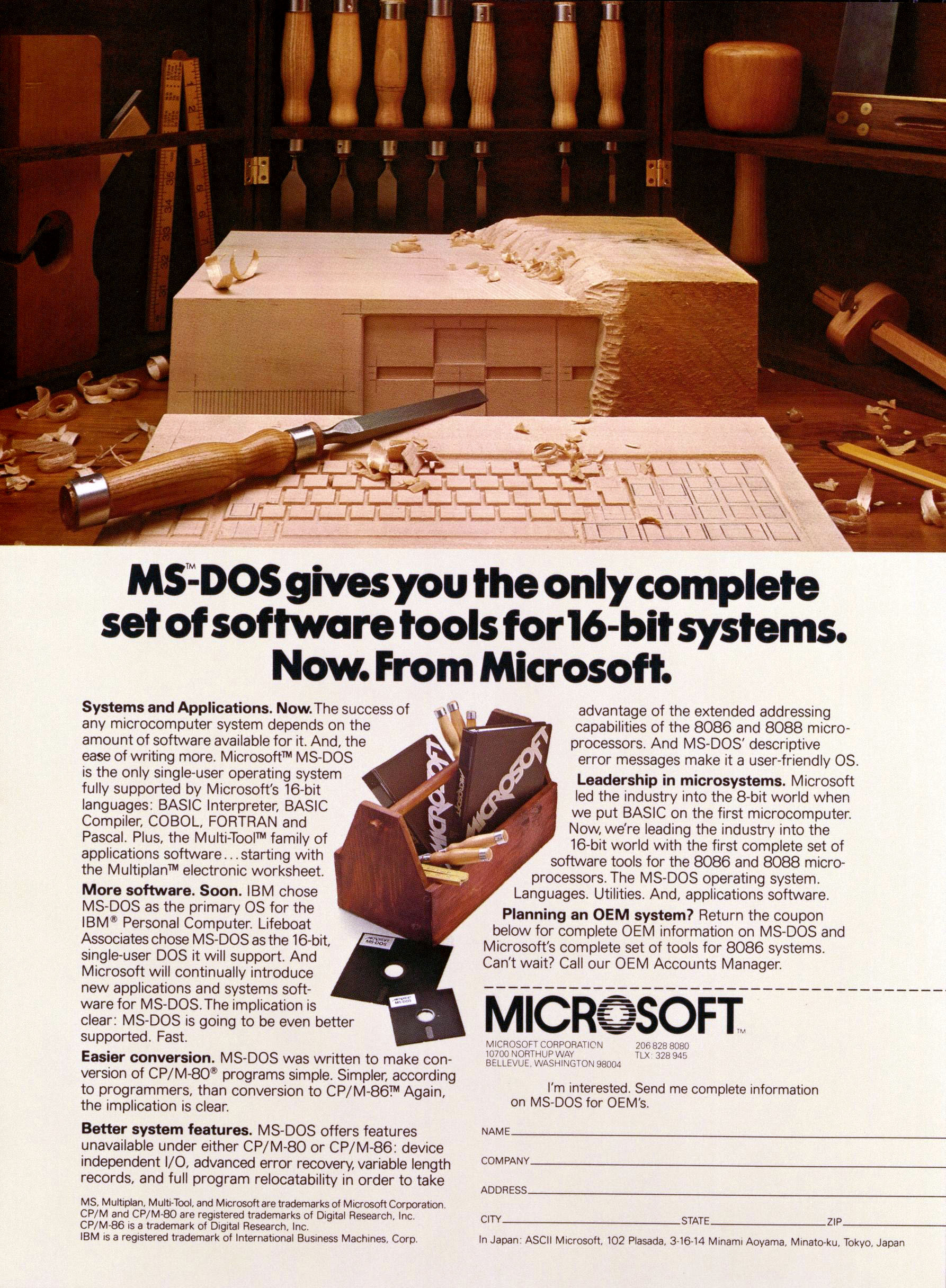
The original MS-DOS advertisement in 1981

On IBM PC compatibles, the initial competition to the PC DOS/MS-DOS line came from Digital Research, whose CP/M operating system had inspired MS-DOS. There remains controversy as to whether 86-DOS was plagiarized from early versions of CP/M code. Digital Research released CP/M-86 a few months after MS-DOS, and it was offered as an alternative to MS-DOS and Microsoft's licensing requirements, but at a higher price. Executable programs for CP/M-86 and MS-DOS were not interchangeable with each other; many applications were sold in both MS-DOS and CP/M-86 versions until MS-DOS became preponderant (later Digital Research operating systems could run both MS-DOS and CP/M-86 software). MS-DOS originally supported the simple .COM, which was modeled after a similar but binary-incompatible format known from CP/M-80. CP/M-86 instead supported a relocatable format using the filename extension .CMD to avoid name conflicts with CP/M-80 and MS-DOS .COM files. MS-DOS version 1.0 added a more advanced relocatable .EXE executable file format.

One of the reasons for the initial success of MS-DOS over competition was the significantly lower retail price of $39.95.

Most of the machines in the early days of MS-DOS had differing system architectures and there was a certain degree of incompatibility, and subsequently vendor lock-in. Users who began using MS-DOS with their machines were compelled to continue using the version customized for their hardware, or face trying to get all of their proprietary hardware and software to work with the new system.

In the business world, the 808x-based machines that MS-DOS was tied to faced competition from the Unix operating system; the latter ran on many different hardware architectures. Microsoft itself sold a version of Unix for the PC called Xenix.

In the emerging world of home users, a variety of other computers based on various other processors were in serious competition with the IBM PC: the Apple II, Mac, Commodore 64 and others did not use the 808x processor; many 808x machines of different architectures used custom versions of MS-DOS. At first all these machines were in competition. In time the IBM PC hardware configuration became dominant in the 808x market as software written to communicate directly with the PC hardware without using standard operating system calls ran much faster, but on true PC-compatibles only. Non-PC-compatible 808x machines were too small a market to have fast software written for them alone, and the market remained open only for IBM PCs and machines that closely imitated their architecture, all running either a single version of MS-DOS compatible only with PCs, or the equivalent IBM PC DOS. Most clones cost much less than IBM-branded machines of similar performance, and became widely used by home users, while IBM PCs had a large share of the business computer market.

Microsoft and IBM together began what was intended as the follow-on to MS-DOS/PC DOS, called OS/2. When OS/2 was released in 1987, Microsoft began an advertising campaign announcing that "DOS is Dead" and stating that version 4 was the last full release. OS/2 was designed for efficient multi-tasking and offered a number of advanced features that had been designed together with similar look and feel; it was seen as the legitimate heir to the "kludgy" DOS platform.

MS-DOS had grown in spurts, with many significant features being taken or duplicated from Microsoft's other products and operating systems. MS-DOS also grew by incorporating, by direct licensing or feature duplicating, the functionality of tools and utilities developed by independent companies, such as Norton Utilities, PC Tools (Microsoft Anti-Virus), QEMM expanded memory manager, Stacker disk compression, and others.

During the period when Digital Research was competing in the operating system market some computers, like the Amstrad PC1512, were sold with floppy disks for two operating systems (only one of which could be used at a time), MS-DOS and CP/M-86 or a derivative of it. Digital Research produced DOS Plus, which was compatible with MS-DOS 2.11, supported CP/M-86 programs, had additional features including multi-tasking, and could read and write disks in CP/M and MS-DOS format.

While OS/2 was under protracted development, Digital Research released the MS-DOS compatible DR-DOS 5.0, which included features only available as third-party add-ons for MS-DOS. Unwilling to lose any portion of the market, Microsoft responded by announcing the "pending" release of MS-DOS 5.0 in May 1990. This effectively killed most DR DOS sales until the actual release of MS-DOS 5.0 in June 1991. Digital Research brought out DR DOS 6.0, which sold well until the "pre-announcement" of MS-DOS 6.0 again stifled the sales of DR DOS.

Microsoft had been accused of carefully orchestrating leaks about future versions of MS-DOS in an attempt to create what in the industry is called FUD (fear, uncertainty, and doubt) regarding DR DOS. For example, in October 1990, shortly after the release of DR DOS 5.0, and long before the eventual June 1991 release of MS-DOS 5.0, stories on feature enhancements in MS-DOS started to appear in InfoWorld and PC Week. Brad Silverberg, then Vice President of Systems Software at Microsoft and general manager of its Windows and MS-DOS Business Unit, wrote a forceful letter to PC Week (November 5, 1990), denying that Microsoft was engaged in FUD tactics ("to serve our customers better, we decided to be more forthcoming about version 5.0") and denying that Microsoft copied features from DR DOS:

The feature enhancements of MS-DOS version 5.0 were decided and development was begun long before we heard about DR DOS 5.0. There will be some similar features. With 50 million MS-DOS users, it shouldn't be surprising that DRI has heard some of the same requests from customers that we have.

The pact between Microsoft and IBM to promote OS/2 began to fall apart in 1990 when Windows 3.0 became a marketplace success. Many of Microsoft's further contributions to OS/2 also went into creating a third GUI replacement for DOS, Windows NT. IBM, which had already been developing the next version of OS/2, carried on development of the platform without Microsoft and sold it as the alternative to DOS and Windows.

== Legal issues ==
As a response to Digital Research's DR DOS 6.0, which bundled SuperStor disk compression, Microsoft opened negotiations with Stac Electronics, vendor of the most popular DOS disk compression tool, Stacker. In the due diligence process, Stac engineers had shown Microsoft part of the Stacker source code. Stac was unwilling to meet Microsoft's terms for licensing Stacker and withdrew from the negotiations. Microsoft chose to license Vertisoft's DoubleDisk, using it as the core for its DoubleSpace disk compression.

MS-DOS 6.0 and 6.20 were released in 1993, both including the Microsoft DoubleSpace disk compression utility program. Stac successfully sued Microsoft for patent infringement regarding the compression algorithm used in DoubleSpace. This resulted in the 1994 release of MS-DOS 6.21, which had disk compression removed. Shortly afterwards came version 6.22, with a new version of the disk compression system, DriveSpace, which had a different compression algorithm to avoid the infringing code.

Prior to 1995, Microsoft licensed MS-DOS (and Windows) to computer manufacturers under three types of agreement: per-processor (a fee for each system the company sold), per-system (a fee for each system of a particular model), or per-copy (a fee for each copy of MS-DOS installed). The largest manufacturers used the per-processor arrangement, which had the lowest fee. This arrangement made it expensive for the large manufacturers to migrate to any other operating system, such as DR DOS. In 1991, the U.S. government Federal Trade Commission began investigating Microsoft's licensing procedures, resulting in a 1994 settlement agreement limiting Microsoft to per-copy licensing. Digital Research did not gain by this settlement, and years later its successor in interest, Caldera, sued Microsoft for damages in the Caldera v. Microsoft lawsuit. It was believed that the settlement ran in the order of $150 million, but was revealed in November 2009 with the release of the Settlement Agreement to be $280 million.

== Use of undocumented APIs ==
Microsoft also used a variety of tactics in MS-DOS and several of their applications and development tools that, while operating perfectly when running on genuine MS-DOS (and PC DOS), would break when run on another vendor's implementation of DOS. Notable examples of this practice included:

- Microsoft's QuickPascal (released in early 1989) was the first MS product that checked for MS-DOS by modifying the program's Program Segment Prefix using undocumented DOS functions, and then checked whether or not the associated value changed in a fixed position within the DOS data segment (also undocumented). This check also made it into later MS products, including Microsoft QuickC v2.5, Programmer's Workbench and Microsoft C v6.0.
- The AARD code, a block of code in the Windows launcher (WIN.COM) and a few other system files of Windows 3.1. It was XOR encrypted, self-modifying, and deliberately obfuscated, using various undocumented DOS structures and functions to determine whether or not Windows really was running on MS-DOS. In the beta versions, it displayed an "error" message if the test for genuine MS-DOS failed, prompting the user to abort or continue, with abort the default. In the final release version, the code still ran, but the message and prompt were disabled by an added flag byte, rendering it (probably) ineffectual.
  - Windows 3.0 beta release only gave a warning that Windows would not operate properly on a "foreign" OS and actually ran well on DR DOS 6.0.
- Interrupt routines called by Windows to inform MS-DOS that Windows is starting/exiting, information that MS-DOS retained in an IN_WINDOWS flag, in spite of the fact that MS-DOS and Windows were supposed to be two separate products.

== Windows command-line interface ==
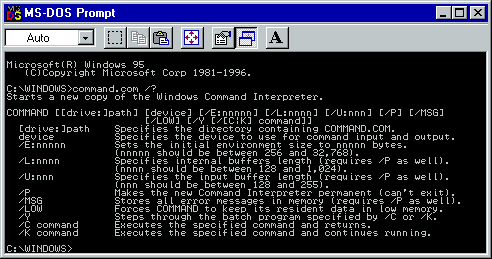
MS-DOS Prompt in Windows 95

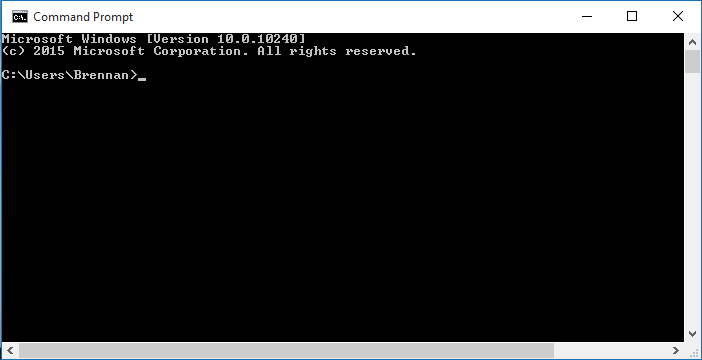
Command Prompt in Windows 10

All versions of Microsoft Windows have had an MS-DOS or MS-DOS-like command-line interface called MS-DOS Prompt which redirected input to MS-DOS and output from MS-DOS to the MS-DOS Prompt, or, in later versions, Command Prompt. This could run many DOS and variously Win32, OS/2 1.x and POSIX command-line utilities in the same command-line session, allowing piping between commands. The user interface, and the icon up to Windows 2000, followed the native MS-DOS interface. The Command Prompt introduced with Windows NT is not actually MS-DOS, but shares some commands with MS-DOS.

=== Earlier versions of Windows ===
The first versions of Windows up to 2.0 ran as a graphical user interface (GUI) on top of MS-DOS. Windows 3.0 and 3.1 virtualized MS-DOS in Virtual 8086 machines and used it to access the filesystem when virtualized. With Windows 95, 98, and Me, the role of MS-DOS was reduced to a boot loader according to Microsoft, with MS-DOS programs running in a virtual DOS machine within 32-bit Windows, with ability to boot directly into MS-DOS retained as a backward compatibility option for applications that required real mode access to the hardware, which was generally not possible within Windows. The command line accessed the DOS command line (usually COMMAND.COM) through a Windows module (WINOLDAP.MOD).

=== Windows NT ===
Windows NT-based operating systems boot to a kernel whose purpose is to load Windows and run the system. One cannot run Win32 applications in the loader system in the manner that OS/2, UNIX or consumer versions of Windows can launch character-mode sessions.

The command session permits running various supported command-line utilities from Win32, MS-DOS, OS/2 1.x and POSIX. The emulators for MS-DOS, OS/2 and POSIX use the host's window in the same way that Win16 applications use the Win32 explorer. Using the host's window allows one to pipe output between emulations.

The MS-DOS emulation takes place through the NTVDM (NT Virtual DOS Machine). This is a modified SoftPC (a former product similar to VirtualPC), running a modified MS-DOS 5 (NTIO.SYS and NTDOS.SYS). The output is handled by the console DLLs, so that the program at the prompt (CMD.EXE, 4NT.EXE, TCC.EXE), can see the output. 64-bit Windows has neither the DOS emulation, nor the DOS commands EDIT, DEBUG and EDLIN that come with 32-bit Windows.

The DOS version returns 5.00 or 5.50, depending on which API function is used to determine it. Utilities from MS-DOS 5.00 run in this emulation without modification. The very early beta programs of NT show MS-DOS 30.00, but programs running in MS-DOS 30.00 would assume that OS/2 was in control.

The OS/2 emulation is handled through OS2SS.EXE and OS2.EXE, and DOSCALLS.DLL. OS2.EXE is a version of the OS/2 shell (CMD.EXE), which passes commands down to the OS2SS.EXE, and input-output to the Windows NT shell. Windows 2000 was the last version of NT to support OS/2. The emulation is OS/2 1.30.

POSIX is emulated through the POSIX shell, but no emulated shell; the commands are handled directly in CMD.EXE.

The Command Prompt is often called the MS-DOS Prompt. In part, this was the official name for it in Windows 9x and early versions of Windows NT (NT 3.5 and earlier), and in part because the SoftPC emulation of DOS redirects output into it. Actually only COMMAND.COM and other 16-bit commands run in an NTVDM with AUTOEXEC.NT and CONFIG.NT initialization determined by _DEFAULT.PIF, optionally permitting the use of Win32 console applications and internal commands with an NTCMDPROMPT directive.

Win32 console applications use CMD.EXE as their command prompt shell. This confusion does not exist under OS/2 because there are separate DOS and OS/2 prompts, and running a DOS program under OS/2 will launch a separate DOS window to run the application.

All versions of Windows for Itanium (no longer sold by Microsoft) and x86-64 architectures no longer include the NTVDM and can therefore no longer natively run DOS or 16-bit Windows applications. There are alternatives such as virtual machine emulators such as Microsoft's own Virtual PC, as well as VMware, DOSBox etc., unofficial compatibility layers such as NTVDMx64, OTVDM (WineVDM), Win3mu and others.

== End-of-life ==
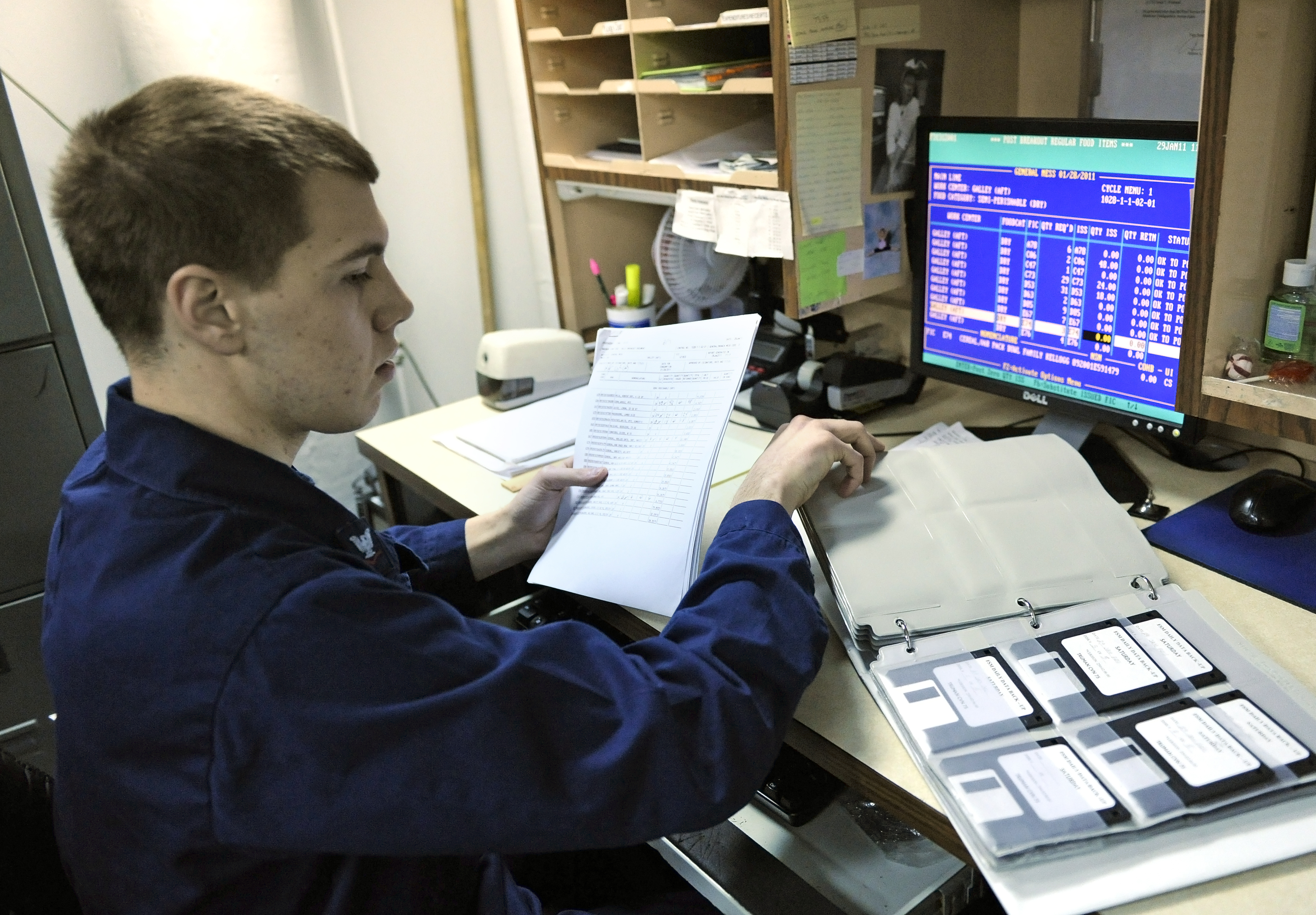
As of 2011, MS-DOS was still used in some enterprises to run legacy applications, such as this US Navy food service management system.

The introduction of Windows 3.0 in 1990, with an easy-to-use graphical user interface, marked the beginning of the end for the command-line driven MS-DOS. With the release of Windows 95 (and continuing in the Windows 9x product line through to Windows Me), an integrated version of MS-DOS was used for bootstrapping, troubleshooting, and backwards-compatibility with old DOS software, particularly games, and no longer released as a standalone product. In Windows 95, the DOS, called MS-DOS 7, can be booted separately, without the Windows GUI; this capability was retained through Windows 98 Second Edition. Windows Me removed the capability to boot its underlying MS-DOS 8.0 alone from a hard disk, but retained the ability to make a DOS boot floppy disk (called an "Emergency Boot Disk") and can be hacked to restore full access to the underlying DOS. On December 31, 2001, Microsoft declared all versions of MS-DOS (6.22 and older) obsolete and stopped providing support and updates for the system. As MS-DOS 7.0 was a part of Windows 95, support for it also ended when Windows 95 extended support ended on December 31, 2001. As MS-DOS 7.10 and MS-DOS 8.0 were part of Windows 98 and Windows ME, respectively, support ended when Windows 98 and ME extended support ended on July 11, 2006, thus ending support and updates of MS-DOS from Microsoft.

In contrast to the Windows 9x series, the Windows NT-derived 32-bit operating systems (Windows NT, 2000, XP and newer), developed alongside the 9x series, do not contain MS-DOS compatibility as a core component of the operating system nor do they rely on it for bootstrapping, as NT was not with the level of support for legacy MS-DOS and Win16 apps that Windows 9x was, but does provide limited DOS emulation called NTVDM (NT Virtual DOS Machine) to run DOS applications and provide DOS-like command prompt windows. 64-bit versions of Windows NT prior to Windows 11 (and Windows Server 2008 R2 by extension) do not provide DOS emulation and cannot run DOS applications natively. Windows XP onwards contains a copy of the Windows Me boot disk, stripped down to bootstrap only. This is accessible only by formatting a floppy as an "MS-DOS startup disk". Files like the driver for the CD-ROM support were deleted from the Windows Me bootdisk and the startup files (AUTOEXEC.BAT and CONFIG.SYS) no longer had content. This modified disk was the base for creating the MS-DOS image for Windows XP. Some of the deleted files can be recovered with an undelete tool. When booting up an MS-DOS startup disk made with the format tool from Windows XP onwards, the version number and the VER internal command reports as "Windows Millennium" and "5.1" (as opposed to "4.90.3000" in Windows Me), respectively, and not as "MS-DOS 8.0" (which was used as the base for Windows Me but never released as a stand-alone product), though the API still says Version 8.0.

The creation of the MS-DOS startup disk was then carried over to later versions of Windows, with the majority of its contents remaining unchanged from its introduction in Windows XP. When creating a DOS startup disk on Windows Vista, the files on the startup disk are dated April 18, 2005, but are otherwise unchanged from XP, including the string "MS-DOS Version 8 Copyright 1981–1999 Microsoft Corp" inside COMMAND.COM. Windows 7, 8, and 8.1 can also create a MS-DOS startup disk, which are otherwise unchanged from XP and Vista. Starting with Windows 10, the ability to create a MS-DOS startup disk has been removed, and so either a virtual machine running MS-DOS or an older version (in a virtual machine or dual boot) must be used to format a floppy disk, or an image must be obtained from an external source. Other solutions include using DOS compatible alternatives, such as FreeDOS or even copying the required files and boot sector themselves. The last remaining components related to MS-DOS was the NTVDM component, which was removed entirely in Windows starting with Windows 11 as the operating system dropped support for 32-bit processors in favor of being solely offered in 64-bit versions only. This effectively ended any association of MS-DOS within Microsoft Windows after 36 years.

MS-DOS 6.22 was the last standalone version produced by Microsoft for Intel 8088, Intel 8086, and Intel 80286 processors, which remains available for download via their MSDN, volume license, and OEM license partner websites, for customers with valid login credentials. MS-DOS is still used in embedded x86 systems due to its simple architecture and minimal memory and processor requirements, though some current products have switched to the still-maintained open-source alternative FreeDOS.

=== Open source ===
In 2018, Microsoft released the source code for MS-DOS 1.25 and 2.0 on GitHub under the open source MIT License, and in 2024 released the source code for MS-DOS 4.00 in the same repository. The purpose of this, according to Microsoft, is mainly for education and experimentation with historic operating systems and for new programmers to gain an understanding of how low-level software works, both historic and current. According to program manager Rich Turner, the other versions could not be open-sourced due to third-party licensing restrictions.

Due to the historical nature of the software, Microsoft will not accept any pull requests to the code. However, its permissive MIT License allows users to download, modify and fork the software as long as credit is given to its original authors.

== Legacy compatibility ==
From 1983 onwards, various companies worked on graphical user interfaces (GUIs) capable of running on PC hardware. However, this required duplicated effort and did not provide much consistency in interface design (even between products from the same company).

Later, in 1985, Microsoft Windows 1.0 was released as Microsoft's first attempt at providing a consistent user interface (for applications). The early versions of Windows ran on top of MS-DOS. At first Windows met with little success, but this was also true for most other companies' efforts as well, for example GEM. After version 3.0, Windows gained market acceptance.

Windows 9x used MS-DOS to boot the Windows kernel in protected mode. Basic features related to the file system, such as long file names, were only available to DOS applications when running through Windows. Windows NT runs independently of DOS but includes NTVDM, a component for simulating a DOS environment for legacy applications. It was not included with Windows 11 as the operating system is exclusively offered in 64-bit architectures such as x86-64.

== Related systems ==
MS-DOS compatible systems include:

- IBM PC DOS
- DR-DOS, Novell DOS, OpenDOS
- FreeDOS
- PTS-DOS
- ROM-DOS

Microsoft made IBM PC DOS for IBM. It and MS-DOS were identical products that eventually diverged starting with MS-DOS version 6.0. Digital Research did not follow Microsoft's version numbering scheme. For example, MS-DOS 4, released in July 1988, was followed by DR DOS 5.0 in May 1990. MS-DOS 5.0 came in April 1991, and DR DOS 6.0 was released the following June.

These products are collectively referred to as "DOS", even though "Disk Operating System" is a generic term used on other systems unrelated to the x86 and IBM PC. "MS-DOS" can also be a generic reference to DOS on IBM PC compatible computers.

Microsoft's control of the Windows platform, and their programming practices which intentionally made Windows appear as if it ran poorly on competing versions of DOS, crippled the ability of other DOS makers to continue to compete with MS-DOS. Digital Research had to release interim releases to circumvent Windows limitations inserted artificially, designed specifically to provide Microsoft with a competitive advantage.

== See also ==
- 4DOS – Command line interpreter
- Bad command or file name – MS-DOS error
- DOSBox – Free MS-DOS emulator
- DOS memory management – Techniques employed to give access to more than 640 kibibytes
- History of Microsoft Windows
- Index of DOS games
- List of DOS commands
- OS/2 – Operating system from IBM
- Tao ExDOS – MS-DOS emulator for Windows
- Towns OS – an MS-DOS adaptation for FM Towns
- Win32 console – GUI for Windows console applications
- Quick Menu – Graphical user interface
