= Computer Russification =

Localization to the Russian language

In computing, Russification (Russian: русификация) involves the localization of computers and software, allowing the user interface of a computer and its software to communicate in the Russian language using Cyrillic script.

Problems associated with Russification before the advent of Unicode included the absence of a single character-encoding standard for Cyrillic.

== History of the MS-DOS Russification ==
The first official Russification of MS-DOS was carried out for MS-DOS 4.01 in 1989/1990, released on 9 April 1990. In Microsoft, the Russification project manager and one of its main developers was Nikolai Lyubovny (Николай Любовный). A Russian version of MS-DOS 5.0 was also developed in 1991, released on 9 August 1991. Based on an initiative of Microsoft Germany in March 1991, derivates of the Russian MS-DOS 5.0 drivers used for keyboard, display and printer localization support (DISPLAY.SYS, EGS.CPI, EGA2.CPI, KEYB.COM, KEYBOARD.SYS, MSPRINT.SYS, COUNTRY.SYS, ALPHA.EXE) could also be purchased separately (with English messages) as part of Microsoft's AlphabetPlus kit. This enabled English issues of MS-DOS 3.3, 4.01 and 5.0 to be set up for Eastern European countries like Czechoslovakia, Poland, Hungary, Yugoslavia and Bulgaria.

== Russification of Microsoft Windows ==
A comprehensive instruction set for computer Russification is maintained by Paul Gorodyansky. It is mirrored in many places and recommended by the U.S. Library of Congress.

== See also ==
- Cyrillic script in Unicode
- Cyrillization
- GOST 10859
- Mojibake
- PTS-DOS
- Romanization of Russian
