= MS-DOS Editor =

Text editor in MS-DOS and Windows 9x

- Developer: Microsoft
- Release: June 1991; 35 years ago
- Stable release: 2.0.026 / 1995; 31 years ago
- Operating system: MS-DOS, PC DOS, OS/2, Microsoft Windows
- Platform: Intel x86, 16-bit
- Predecessor: Edlin
- Successor: Windows Notepad, Microsoft Edit (see below)
- Type: Text editor
- License: Same as Windows
- Website: learn.microsoft.com/en-us/windows-server/administration/windows-commands/edit

Microsoft Edit

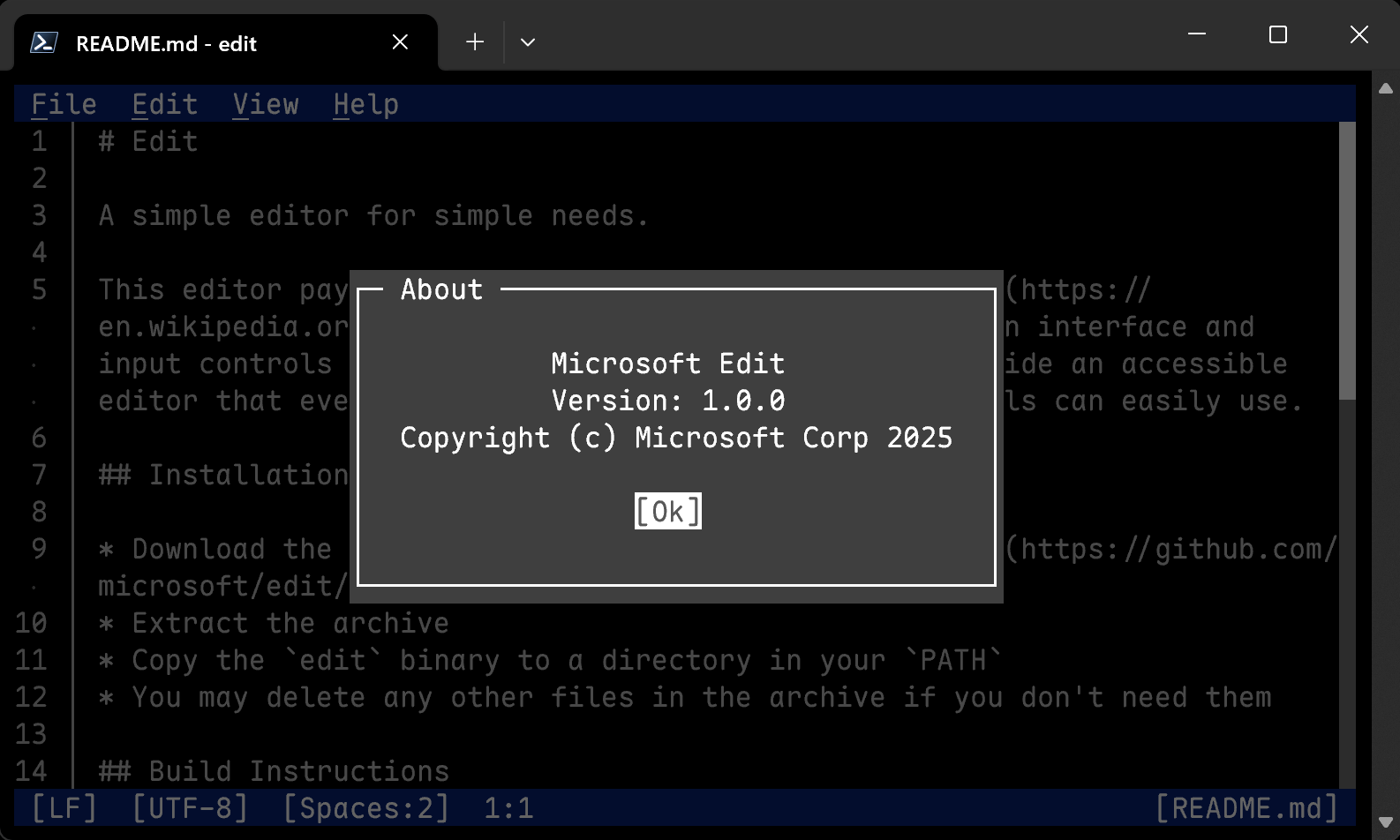
- Developer: Microsoft
- Release: 19 March 2025; 18 months ago
- Stable release: 2.0.0 / 28 April 2026
- Written in: Rust
- Operating system: Windows, Linux, macOS, BSD
- Size: 146kB
- Available in: 30 languages
- List of languages English, Arabic, Bengali, Czech, Danish, German, Greek, Spanish, Persian, Finnish, French, Hungarian, Indonesian, Icelandic, Italian, Japanese, Korean, Dutch, Portuguese (Brazil), Portuguese (Portugal), Romanian, Russian, Serbian (Cyrillic), Serbian (Latin), Swedish, Turkmen, Turkish, Vietnamese, Chinese (Simplified), Chinese (Traditional)
- Type: Text editor
- License: MIT License
- Repository: https://github.com/microsoft/edit

MS-DOS Editor, commonly just called edit or edit.com, is a TUI text editor. Originally, it was a 16-bit application that shipped with MS-DOS 5.0 and later, as well as all 32-bit x86 versions of Windows. It supersedes edlin, the standard editor in earlier versions of MS-DOS. Originally, EDIT.COM was a stub that ran QBasic in editor mode. Starting with Windows 95, MS-DOS Editor became a standalone program because QBasic did not ship with Windows. In 2025, Microsoft released a free and open-source remake.

== Overview ==
=== Original ===
The Editor version 1.0 appeared in MS-DOS 5.00, IBM PC DOS 5.0, OS/2, and Windows NT 4.0. This version relies on QBasic 1.0. Hence, it uses a text-based user interface (TUI), and its color scheme can be adjusted. It can only open one file, but can open the quick help file in a split window.

The Editor version 1.1 appeared in MS-DOS 6.0. It uses QBasic 1.1 but no new features were added to the Editor.

IBM PC DOS 6 dropped the Editor in favor of another text editor called E, which supports mouse and menus in version 7.0.

The Editor version 2.0 appeared with Windows 95, as standalone app that no longer requires QBasic. It has a multiple-document interface and can open up to 9 files. The screen can be split vertically into two panes which can be used to view two files simultaneously or different parts of the same file. It can also open files in binary mode, where a fixed number of characters are displayed per line, with newlines treated like any other character. This mode shows characters as hexadecimal characters (0-9 and A-F). Editor converts Unix newlines (LF) to DOS newlines (CRLF) and has mouse support. This version has been included with all 32-bit x86 versions. Being a 16-bit DOS app, it cannot run on x64, IA-64, or ARM64 versions of Windows.

The Editor may be used as a substitute for Windows Notepad, although the 16-bit version is limited to files smaller than 300 kB, depending on how much conventional memory is free.

=== FreeDOS derivative ===
The FreeDOS version was developed by Shaun Raven and is licensed under the GPL.

=== Remake ===
On May 18, 2025, Microsoft released an open-source recreation of the Editor written in the Rust programming language, simply named Edit, for modern versions of Windows. The version number did not continue, resetting to 1.0.0. Edit was included with the Windows 11 2025 Update or 25H2.
