= Seattle Computer Products =

1970s–1980s American microcomputer hardware company

- Industry: Microcomputer hardware and software
- Founded: 1978
- Defunct: 1986
- Headquarters: Tukwila, Washington
- Key people: Rodney Maurice Brock, Tim Paterson
- Products: S-100 8086 boards, 86-DOS

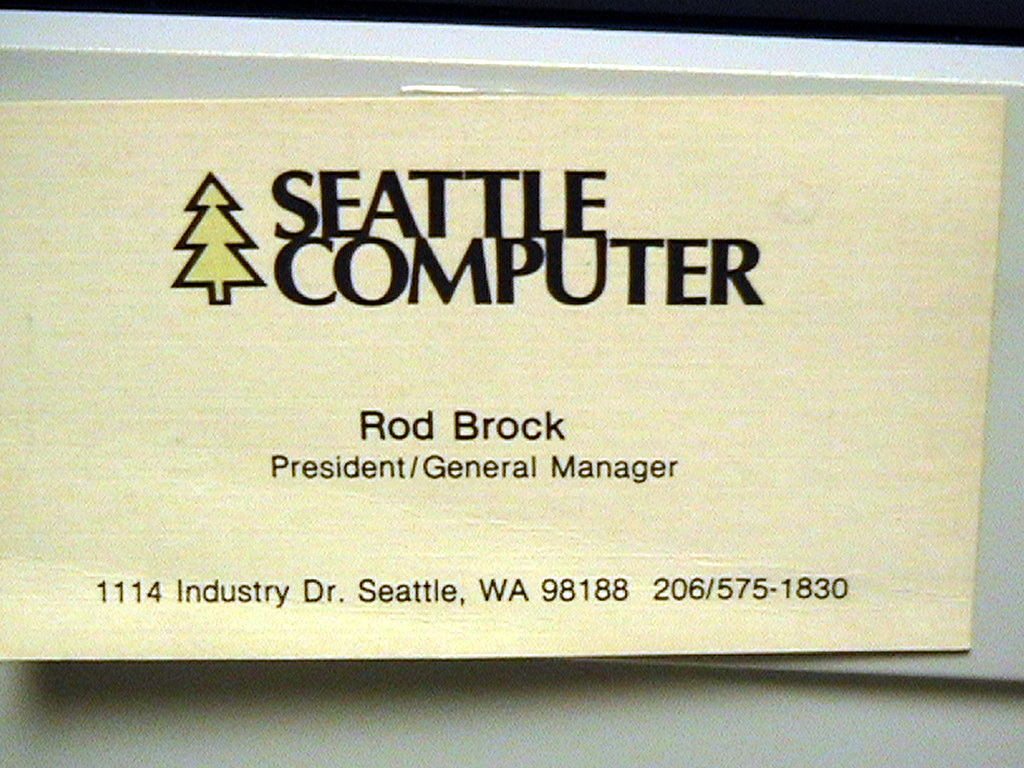
Rod M. Brock's business card

Seattle Computer Products (SCP) was a Tukwila, Washington, microcomputer hardware company which was one of the first manufacturers of computer systems based on the 16-bit Intel 8086 processor. Founded in 1978, SCP began shipping its first S-100 bus 8086 CPU boards to customers in November 1979, about 21 months before IBM introduced its Personal Computer which was based on the slower 8088 and introduced the 8-bit ISA bus. SCP shipped an operating system for that hardware about a year before the release of the PC, which was modified by Microsoft for the PC and renamed IBM PC DOS. SCP was staffed partly by high-school students from nearby communities who soldered and assembled the computers. Some of them would later work for Microsoft.

== Corporate history ==
Twenty-two-year-old Tim Paterson was hired in June 1978 by SCP's owner Rodney Maurice Brock (26 August 1930 – 30 November 2018). At the time, SCP built memory boards for microcomputers, but after attending a local seminar on Intel's just-released 8086 in late summer 1978, Paterson convinced Brock that his company should design a CPU board for the new chip. Paterson had a prototype working by May 1979, and he took his "computer" over to Microsoft, who were working on an 8086 BASIC, which was working before the end of May.

When the board began shipping in November, standalone Microsoft BASIC was offered as an option, but no operating system was available for it. Digital Research, whose 8-bit CP/M operating system was the industry standard, was working on an 8086-compatible version called CP/M-86, but the delay in its release was costing SCP sales. In order to fill this void, Paterson wrote QDOS (for Quick and Dirty Operating System) over a four-month period starting in April 1980. QDOS 0.11 was finished in August 1980, and SCP began shipping it in September 1980. The operating system was renamed to 86-DOS in December 1980.

Microsoft, having worked with SCP before and seeking an operating system they could modify for the IBM PC, bought the rights to market the 86-DOS operating system to other manufacturers for US$25,000 that same month. On 27 July 1981, just prior to the launch of the IBM PC on the 12 August 1981, Microsoft bought the full rights to the operating system for an additional US$50,000, giving SCP a perpetual royalty-free license to sell 86-DOS (including updated versions) with its computer hardware. Realizing that Microsoft was making significant profit on the 86-DOS operating system, SCP attempted to sell it along with a stand-alone inexpensive CPU (without any other circuitry). This was allowed as per SCP's license with Microsoft, which let SCP sell the operating system with their 8086-based computers; this operating system was marketed as "Seattle DOS", and a CPU was included in the box it shipped in.

Thanks to the deal with Microsoft, additional capital allowed Seattle Computer to expand its memory business into providing additional memory for PC products. The company had its best year in 1982, reaping more than a million dollars in profit on about $4 million in sales.

By 1985, however, SCP's business was having difficulty trying to compete with offshore products (Brock once said, "they were selling memory boards for less than his cost for parts"), and Brock decided to sell the company. The only major asset SCP had left was the license it received from Microsoft when it signed over ownership rights to 86-DOS. Brock planned to sell (via merger) the license to the highest bidder, with a company such as the Tandy Corporation in mind. After Microsoft objected to Brock's "exaggerated interpretation" of the agreement and informed Brock that his license was nontransferable, Brock sued for US$60 million. The ensuing lawsuit was highly technical and grew to fill hundreds of pages in the months leading up to trial. The trial began at the end of 1986 and lasted three weeks. An out-of-court settlement was reached while the jury was deliberating. Microsoft paid SCP US$925,000 and reclaimed its license for DOS.

SCP went out of business in 1986 as the market for Intel 8086 systems became dominated by PC compatible computers.

== See also ==
- Microsoft Softcard (SCP developed prototypes of Z80 card for Apple II, further developed by Burtronix and manufactured by California Computer Systems for Microsoft)
- Pirates of Silicon Valley has a scene where Paul Allen visits Rod Brock at Seattle Computer Products.
