= Tim Paterson =

American computer programmer

- Born: 1 June 1956 (age 70)
- Education: University of Washington
- Occupations: Computer programmer, software designer
- Known for: Z-80 SoftCard, 86-DOS, MSX-DOS

Tim Paterson (born 1 June 1956) is an American computer programmer, best known for creating 86-DOS, an operating system for the Intel 8086. This system emulated the application programming interface (API) of CP/M, which was created by Gary Kildall. 86-DOS later formed the basis of MS-DOS, the most widely used personal computer operating system in the 1980s.

== Biography ==
Paterson was educated in the Seattle Public Schools, graduating from Ingraham High School in 1974. He attended the University of Washington, working as a repair technician for The Retail Computer Store in the Green Lake area of Seattle, Washington, and graduated magna cum laude with a degree in Computer Science in June 1978. He went to work for Seattle Computer Products as a designer and engineer. He designed the hardware of Microsoft's Z-80 SoftCard which had a Z80 CPU and ran the CP/M operating system on an Apple II.

A month later, Intel released the 8086 CPU, and Paterson went to work designing an S-100 8086 board, which went to market in November 1979. The only commercial software that existed for the board was Microsoft's Standalone Disk BASIC-86. The standard CP/M operating system at the time was not available for this CPU and without a true operating system, sales were slow. Paterson began work on QDOS (Quick and Dirty Operating System) in April 1980 to fill that void, copying the APIs of CP/M from references, including the published CP/M manual, so that it would be highly compatible. QDOS was soon renamed as 86-DOS. Version 0.10 was complete by July 1980. By version 1.14, 86-DOS had grown to 4000 lines of assembly code. In December 1980, Microsoft secured the rights to market 86-DOS to other hardware manufacturers.

While acknowledging that he made 86-DOS compatible with CP/M, Paterson has maintained that the 86-DOS program was his original work and has denied allegations that he referred to CP/M code while writing it. When a book appeared in 2004 claiming that 86-DOS was an unoriginal "rip-off" of CP/M, Paterson sued the authors and publishers for defamation. The judge found that Paterson failed to "provide any evidence regarding 'serious doubts' about the accuracy of the Gary Kildall chapter. Instead, a careful review of the Lefer notes ... provides a research picture tellingly close to the substance of the final chapter" and the case was dismissed on the basis that the book's claims were constitutionally protected opinions and not provably false.

Paterson left SCP in April 1981 and worked for Microsoft from May 1981 to April 1982. Microsoft renamed 86-DOS to MS-DOS on 27 July 1981. After a brief second stint with SCP, Paterson started his own company, Falcon Technology, a.k.a. Falcon Systems. In 1983, Microsoft contracted Paterson to port MS-DOS to the MSX computers standard they were developing with ASCII Corporation. Paterson accepted the contract to help fund his company and completed the work on the MSX-DOS operating system in 1984. Falcon Technology was bought by Microsoft in 1986 to reclaim one out of two issued royalty-free licenses for MS-DOS (the other belonging to SCP), eventually becoming part of Phoenix Technologies. Paterson worked a second stint with Microsoft from 1986 to 1988, and a third stint from 1990 to 1998, during which time he worked on Visual Basic.

After leaving Microsoft a third time, Paterson founded another software development company, Paterson Technology, and also made several appearances as a competitor on the Comedy Central television program BattleBots. Paterson has also raced rally cars in the SCCA Pro Rally series, and even engineered his own trip computer, which he integrated into the axle of a four-wheel-drive Porsche 911.
