= Alan Paller =

Cybersecurity expert (1945–2021)

- Born: September 17, 1945; Indianapolis, Indiana, U.S.
- Died: November 9, 2021; Bethesda, Maryland, U.S.
- Education: Massachusetts Institute of Technology, Mechanical Engineering and New Computer Programming Languages (MEng 1968)
- Occupations: computer security, internet security expert

Alan Paller (September 17, 1945 – November 9, 2021) was a cyber security expert, the founder of the SANS Institute, and the founder and former president of SANS Technology Institute. He was also the president emeritus of SANS Technology Institute and served as president of the National Cyber Scholarship Foundation

== Biography ==
=== Early life and education ===
Alan Terry Paller was born on September 17, 1945, in Indianapolis, Indiana. In 1967, he graduated from Cornell University with a bachelor's degree in mechanical engineering. He received his master's degree in 1968 from Massachusetts Institute of Technology. His father, Benjamin Paller, was an engineer, while his mother, Ruth Pearl Paller, taught English at a high school.

=== Early career ===
After graduation, he worked for the Institute for Defense Analyses where he learned of security risks in computer systems for missile-defense needs. Paller co-founded the SANS Institute in 1989 with his wife to promote efficient system management and secure operations. Earlier in his career, Paller worked for the United States Navy, using computers to assist in ship design, before co-founding a computer timesharing company in Hawaii and later establishing a consultancy specializing in applied computer graphics technology. The SANS Institute was established in 1988 as a cooperative for information security professionals to exchange technical information and receive training. During this period, the institute expanded its training, certification and research activities.

During the 1970s and 1980s, Paller worked as a consultant on the application of computer technology for government and private-sector organizations. His experience across engineering, software development and systems management later influenced the practical approach adopted by the SANS Institute toward cybersecurity education and professional training.

Paller co-founded the SANS Institute in 1988 with his wife as a cooperative for information security professionals to exchange technical knowledge and operational experience. Under his leadership, it expanded into a provider of cybersecurity training, professional certifications, conferences and research, becoming one of the best-known organizations in the field.

In 2005, Paller founded the SANS Technology Institute, an accredited graduate institution specializing in cybersecurity education, and served as its president before becoming president emeritus. He remained involved with the institute after stepping down from its leadership.

== Public service ==
Paller served on a number of federal advisory bodies concerned with cybersecurity and critical infrastructure protection. He was a member of the National Infrastructure Advisory Council during the administration of President Bill Clinton and later served on the NASA Advisory Council.

Paller testified before committees of the United States Senate and the United States House of Representatives on matters relating to cybersecurity, critical infrastructure protection and workforce development.

In 2012, he was named, along with Jeff Moss, as co-chairs of the Department of Homeland Security task force on cyber skills. As co-chair of the task force, Paller worked on recommendations for developing the federal cybersecurity workforce. He argued that agencies should place greater emphasis on technical skills when recruiting and training cybersecurity personnel. Paller also chaired the Task Force on Best Practices in Cybersecurity for the Federal Communications Commission's Communications Security, Reliability and Interoperability Council (CSRIC), where he contributed to recommendations on cybersecurity best practices for critical communications infrastructure.

Paller participated in discussions on cybersecurity policy following major cyber incidents affecting government and private-sector networks. Following the spread of the Code Red computer worm in 2001, he organized meetings between government officials and private-sector cybersecurity specialists to improve information sharing and incident response.

He also supported the development of a prioritized set of cybersecurity best practices that later became known as the Center for Internet Security Controls, originally published as the Consensus Audit Guidelines.

Throughout his career, Paller advocated greater cooperation between government agencies, private industry and educational institutions in addressing cybersecurity challenges. He also promoted practical skills-based education and professional training as part of workforce development initiatives.

== Recognition ==
Paller received several awards and government appointments during his career, including testifying before the US Senate and House of Representatives and receiving the Azimuth Award in 2005.

In 2009, Paller received the FCW Federal 100 Award in recognition of his contributions to federal information technology and cybersecurity.

In 2010, he was named one of seven people "worth knowing in cyber security" by The Washington Post.

His appointments to advisory bodies, participation in congressional hearings and involvement in national cybersecurity initiatives reflected his role in cybersecurity policy and workforce development within the United States.

== Death ==
Paller died at his home in Bethesda, Maryland, on November 9, 2021, at the age of 76. He was survived by his wife, Marsha Mann Paller, two daughters, a sister, and two grandsons.

== Legacy ==
Paller helped establishing of the National Cyber Scholarship Foundation, an organization that hosts hacking challenges aimed at high school and college students, promoting their participation in the field and held the title of president. The foundation awards students who have demonstrated their abilities through GFACT certification exam with the Alan Paller Honor Scholarship by giving both financial award and the status of Scholar with Honors.

Center for Internet Security honors his memory through the Alan Paller Laureate Program. The Program awards eligible organizations, academic institutions, or individuals. In 2022, RSA Conference awarded him the Lifetime Achievement Award.
