= Internet Storm Center =

- Website type: Internet security monitoring
- Available in: English
- Owner: SANS Institute
- Website: isc.sans.edu
- Commercial: No
- Registration: Optional
- Launched: 2001
- Current status: Active

The Internet Storm Center (ISC) is a program of the SANS Technology Institute, a branch of the SANS Institute which monitors the level of malicious activity on the Internet, particularly with regard to large-scale infrastructure events.

== History ==
The ISC evolved from "Incidents.org", a site initially founded by the SANS Institute to assist in the public-private sector cooperation during the Y2K cutover. In 2000, Incidents.org started to cooperate with DShield to create a Consensus Incidents Database (CID). It collected security information from cooperating sites and agencies for mass analysis.

On March 22, 2001, the SANS CID was responsible for the early detection of the "Lion" worm attacks on various facilities. The quick warning and counter-efforts organized by the CID were instrumental in controlling the damage done by this worm, which otherwise might have been considerably worse.

Later, DShield was integrated closer into incidents.org as the SANS Institute started to sponsor DShield. The CID was renamed the "Internet Storm Center" in acknowledgement of the way it uses the distributed sensor network similar to the way a weather reporting center will detect and track an atmospheric storm and provide warnings. Since that time the ISC has expanded its monitoring operations; its website cites a figure of over twenty million "intrusion detection log entries" per day. It continues to provide analyses and alerts of security threats to the Internet community.

During the last hours of 2005 and the first weeks of 2006, the Internet Storm Center went to its longest period at the time to "yellow" on the Infocon for the WMF vulnerability.

The ISC publishes a daily "Handler Diary", prepared by its volunteer incident handlers to summarize and analyze new threats and Internet security events. The diaries have also been described as a source for new attack trends and as a means of facilitating cooperation among security researchers. The ISC also produces "Stormcast", a daily podcast providing summaries of cybersecurity news. ISC information has been used in coverage of vulnerabilities and exploits by cybersecurity publications. In 2026, Wiz included the ISC among 13 threat-intelligence feeds it recommended for security professionals to follow.

The Internet Storm Center is currently staffed with approximately 40 volunteers, representing 8 countries and many industries.

== Notable members ==
- Director of the ISC: Marcus Sachs
- Chief Technical Officer: Johannes Ullrich
- Handler Tom Liston
