= Giac =

Giac or GIAC may refer to:

- Global Information Assurance Certification, an information security certification entity.
- Giac (software), a C++ library that is part of the Xcas computer algebra system
