= DShield =

DShield at the SANS Internet Storm Center
- Owner: Johannes Ullrich
- Website: www.dshield.org
- Launched: 30 November 2000; 25 years ago

DShield is a community-based collaborative firewall log correlation system. It receives logs from volunteers worldwide and uses them to analyze attack trends. It is used as the data collection engine behind the SANS Internet Storm Center (ISC).

== Overview ==
DShield was officially launched end of November 2000 by Johannes Ullrich. Since then, it has grown to be a dominating attack correlation engine with worldwide coverage.

DShield is regularly used by the media to cover current events. Analysis provided by DShield has been used in the early detection of several worms, like "Ramen", Code Red, "Leaves", "SQL Snake" and more. DShield data is regularly used by researchers to analyze attack patterns.

== Purpose ==
The goal of the DShield project is to allow access to its correlated information to the public at no charge to raise awareness and provide accurate and current snapshots of internet attacks. Several data feeds are provided to users to either include in their own web sites or to use as an aide to analyze events.

== See also ==
- SANS Institute
- ShieldsUP
- SPEWS
