= Johannes Ullrich =

Computer security expert

- Occupation: Computer Security Expert

Johannes Ullrich is the Dean of Research for SANS Technology Institute, a SANS Faculty Fellow, and founder of the SANS Internet Storm Center (DShield), a global network security community. In 2004, Johannes was recognized as one of the Top 50 Most Powerful People in Networking by Network World Magazine.

Johannes grew up in East Germany and moved to the US where he obtained a Ph.D. in physics from the University at Albany. His work on x-ray optics was awarded a number of research grants by NASA and the Department of Energy. He also authored a chapter in the Handbook of Optics. He also was the recipient of the ISSA's 2018 President's Award for Public Service.
