= The CIS Critical Security Controls for Effective Cyber Defense =

Best practice publication of computer security

The CIS Controls (formerly called the Center for Internet Security Critical Security Controls for Effective Cyber Defense) is a publication of best practice guidelines for computer security. The project was initiated early in 2008 in response to extreme data losses experienced by organizations in the US defense industrial base. The publication was initially developed by the SANS Institute and released as the "SANS Top 20." Ownership was then transferred to the Council on Cyber Security (CCS) in 2013, and then transferred to Center for Internet Security (CIS) in 2015. CIS released version 8 of the CIS Controls in 2021.

== Goals ==
The guidelines consist of 18 (originally 20) key actions, called critical security controls (CSC), that organizations should implement to block or mitigate known attacks. The controls are designed so that primarily automated means can be used to implement, enforce and monitor them. The security controls give no-nonsense, actionable recommendations for cyber security, written in language that’s easily understood by IT personnel. Goals of the Consensus Audit Guidelines include

- Leveraging cyber offense to inform cyber defense, focusing on high payoff areas
- Ensuring that security investments are focused to counter highest threats
- Maximizing the use of automation to enforce security controls, thereby negating human errors
- Using consensus process to collect best ideas

== Supported Platforms ==
CIS Benchmarks cover a wide range of technologies, including:

- Operating Systems: Windows, Linux, macOS
- Servers: Apache, NGINX, Microsoft IIS
- Cloud Platforms: AWS, Azure, Google Cloud Platform
- Network Devices: Cisco, Juniper
- Applications: Microsoft Office, Google Chrome, Mozilla Firefox
