= ShieldsUP =

Software

ShieldsUP is an online port scanning service created by Steve Gibson of Gibson Research Corporation. The purpose of the utility is to alert the users of any ports that have been opened through their firewalls or through their NAT routers, which can be used by malicious users to take advantage of security vulnerabilities. The utility scans the most common file sharing ports, as well as all service ports (1–1056), and user defined ports, in sets of 64.

It is often recommended for checking port vulnerabilities.

The scanning servers have the static IP addresses of 4.79.142.192 to 4.79.142.207.

== See also ==
- DShield
