= Bifrost (Trojan horse) =

Family of trojan horses affecting Microsoft Windows

Malware details
- Technical name: Bifrost
- Aliases: (Windows Metafile vulnerability-related: Backdoor-CEP, Bifrost), Backdoor-CKA, Agent.MJ
- Type: Windows 95, Windows 98, Windows Me, Windows NT, Windows 2000, Windows XP, Windows Server 2003, Windows 7, Windows 10
- Subtype: Backdoor
- Classification: Trojan
- Family: Bifrose
- Isolation date: 2004–present
- Origin: Sweden
- Author: ksv

Bifrost is a backdoor trojan horse family of more than 10 variants which can infect Windows 95 through Windows 10 (although on modern Windows systems, after Windows XP, its functionality is limited). Bifrost uses the typical server, server builder, and client backdoor program configuration to allow a remote attacker, who uses the client, to execute arbitrary code on the compromised machine (which runs the server whose behavior can be controlled by the server editor).

The server component (sized around 20–50 kilobytes, depending on variant) is dropped to C:\Program Files\Bifrost\server.exe with default settings and, when running, connects to a predefined IP address on TCP port 81, awaiting commands from the remote user who uses the client component. However, both installation directory and TCP port can be changed.

TCP connection is encrypted with a password (default: "pass"), but this can be changed as well.

It can be assumed that once all three components are operational, the remote user can execute arbitrary code at will on the compromised machine. The server components can also be dropped to C:\Windows and file attributes changed to "Read Only" and "Hidden". Casual users may not see the directories by default due to the "hidden" attributes set on the directory. Some anti-virus programs (example AVG – 17th Feb 2010) seem to miss the file entirely.

The server builder component has the following capabilities:

- Create the server component
- Change the server component's port number and/or IP address
- Change the server component's executable name
- Change the name of the Windows registry startup entry
- Include rootkit to hide server processes
- Include extensions to add features (adds 22,759 bytes to server)
- Use persistence (makes the server harder to remove from the infected system)

The client component has the following capabilities:

- Process Manager (Browse or kill running processes)
- File manager (Browse, upload, download, or delete files)
- Window Manager (Browse, close, maximize/minimize, or rename windows)
- Get system information
- Extract passwords from machine
- Keystroke logging
- Screen capture
- Webcam capture
- Desktop logoff, reboot or shutdown
- Registry editor
- Remote shell

On December 28, 2005, the Windows WMF exploit was used to drop new variants of Bifrost to machines. Some workarounds and unofficial patches were published before Microsoft announced and issued an official patch on January 5, 2006. The WMF exploit is to be considered extremely dangerous.

Older variants of Bifrost used different ports, e.g. 1971, 1999; had a different payload, e.g. C:\Winnt\system32\system.exe; and/or wrote different Windows registry keys.

Bifrost was designed before the introduction of UAC thus Bifrost cannot install itself on modern Windows systems, unless it is launched with administrator privileges.

== See also ==
- Windows Metafile vulnerability
