= Tom Liston =

American analyst

Tom Liston is the founder and owner of the Johnsburg, Illinois-based network security consulting firm, Bad Wolf Security.

He is the author of the first network tarpit, the open source LaBrea. He was a finalist for eWeek and PC Magazine’s "Innovations In Infrastructure" (i3) award in 2002 for LaBrea. He is one of the handlers at the SANS Institute’s Internet Storm Center, where he deals with developing security issues and authors a series of articles under the title “Follow the Bouncing Malware.”

Liston is also, with Ed Skoudis, co-author of the second edition of the network security book Counter Hack Reloaded: A Step-by-Step Guide to Computer Attacks and Effective Defenses.

== Works ==
=== Books ===
- Skoudis, Edward; Liston, Tom (2005). Counter Hack Reloaded: A Step-by-Step Guide to Computer Attacks and Effective Defenses. Upper Saddle River: Prentice Hall PTR. ISBN 0-13-148104-5.
