= SANS Technology Institute =

Private college in North Bethesda, Maryland, US

- Type: Private
- Established: 2005
- Accreditation: Middle States Commission on Higher Education
- President: Ed Skoudis
- Location: North Bethesda, Maryland, United States
- Website: www.sans.edu

SANS Technology Institute (SANS.edu) is a private institution of higher education specializing in cybersecurity education. Based in North Bethesda, Maryland, it offers undergraduate and graduate degree programs and certificates in cybersecurity. The institute is accredited by the Middle States Commission on Higher Education.

== History ==
Cybersecurity educator Alan Paller established SANS Technology Institute in 2005. Paller had founded the SANS Institute in 1989. The institute was established to provide academic education in information security alongside the practical training offered through SANS.

In December 2005, Washington Technology reported that the Maryland Higher Education Commission had approved the institute to offer graduate degrees in cybersecurity, with graduate instruction scheduled to begin in 2006.

The Middle States Commission on Higher Education granted the institute regional accreditation in 2013.

In October 2021, Ed Skoudis was appointed president of SANS Technology Institute. Security Magazine reported that he would oversee the institute's degree and certificate programs and its Internet Storm Center.

Paller died in November 2021. In its obituary, The Washington Post described his work in cybersecurity awareness and workforce development and noted that he had founded SANS Technology Institute in 2005. The obituary also described the institute as a regionally accredited cybersecurity college and graduate school.

A separate Washington Post article published in November 2021 examined congressional efforts to increase cybersecurity assistance for schools. It quoted Johannes Ullrich, dean of research at SANS Technology Institute, discussing Paller's influence on cybersecurity education and people working in the field.

== Academic programs ==
SANS Technology Institute offers undergraduate and graduate programs in cybersecurity. Its offerings include a bachelor's degree in applied cybersecurity, a master's degree in information security engineering, and undergraduate and graduate certificates in specialized cybersecurity subjects.

The institute combines technical cybersecurity instruction with professional certifications from GIAC. Its graduate-degree programs originated with the information-security degrees approved by the Maryland Higher Education Commission in 2005.

In 2024, Help Net Security included SANS Technology Institute in an overview of colleges and universities offering cybersecurity programs.

== Internet Storm Center ==
The SANS Internet Storm Center (ISC) is a cybersecurity monitoring and information service associated with SANS Technology Institute. It publishes information and analysis about security threats. Cybersecurity publications have cited the service in reports about vulnerabilities, exploitation attempts and malware campaigns.

In March 2025, Network World reported that SANS had warned organizations about attempts to exploit vulnerabilities in Cisco Smart Licensing Utility. Johannes Ullrich, the institute's dean of research, issued the warning after the Internet Storm Center detected exploitation activity involving the vulnerabilities.

The Hacker News also reported on the activity, stating that the Internet Storm Center had identified exploitation attempts involving Cisco Smart Licensing Utility vulnerabilities CVE-2024-20439 and CVE-2024-20440.

In November 2025, KrebsOnSecurity cited Ullrich in its coverage of Microsoft's November Patch Tuesday security updates. The article also directed readers to the Internet Storm Center's analysis of Microsoft's individual security fixes.

In October 2025, SC Media reported on a ClickFix attack involving malicious TikTok videos that encouraged users to execute commands that installed malware. The report cited a post by security consultant Xavier Mertens published through the Internet Storm Center.

== Research and cybersecurity commentary ==
Johannes Ullrich, dean of research at SANS Technology Institute, has commented on authentication security and post-quantum cryptography. In a 2022 discussion of passwordless authentication based on the FIDO standards, he addressed the use of mobile devices as authenticators and the potential of passwordless methods to address authentication problems. In 2024, he recommended that organizations inventory their cryptographic systems and test post-quantum algorithms alongside existing infrastructure as they prepare for the transition to post-quantum cryptography. An IBM article that year also addressed technical debt and deepfakes in identity verification, including comments from Ullrich at a SANS Institute event.

Ed Skoudis, president of SANS Technology Institute, addressed emerging attack techniques in a SANS keynote at the 2025 RSA Conference. The topics included authorization sprawl, attacks against industrial control systems, inadequate logging and the use of artificial intelligence in cybersecurity. In 2026, Skoudis discussed Anthropic's use of artificial intelligence to identify software vulnerabilities; he said automated discovery could help defenders respond to the growing number of vulnerabilities and exploits.

Coverage of the 2026 RSA Conference addressed the use of artificial intelligence in cyberattacks and security operations, including AI-assisted exploitation, software supply-chain security, industrial-control-system monitoring and automated attack campaigns. Skoudis participated in the SANS keynote and panel discussions on emerging attack techniques.

== Cybersecurity competitions ==
Students at SANS Technology Institute compete as the SANS.edu Sentinels in the National Cyber League, a collegiate cybersecurity skills competition. The institute ranked first in the Experienced Bracket of the National Cyber League Cyber Power Rankings in spring 2025, fall 2025 and spring 2026, according to announcements published through PRWeb.

The institute also placed in the National Security Agency's annual Codebreaker Challenge, finishing third in 2024 and second in 2025, according to NSA announcements.
