= Third-party verification =

Third-party verification (TPV) is a process of getting an independent party to confirm that the customer is actually requesting a change or ordering a new service or product. By putting the customer on the phone (usually via transfer or 3-way call) the TPV provider asks a customer for his or her identity, that he or she is an authorized decision maker and to confirm the order.

== Methods ==
Third-party verification may be conducted through recorded telephone confirmation, electronic signature workflows, identity-document checks, or other procedures designed to create an independent record of a consumer's authorization. The method used can depend on the transaction type, applicable regulation, and the level of assurance required.

== Who uses ==
In many parts of the world, especially the United States, long distance providers, telemarketing companies are required by law to use a third-party verification service while selling products or services over the phone or they may face substantial penalties or criminal sanction. Merchants who take electronic check payments over the phone are required to receive either written or voice recorded authorizations; or anyone else who wants to have third-party companies, lawyers, appointment setting, schools and universities, utility companies, telecom companies, Internet service providers, security companies, auto dealers service departments, summer camps, healthcare and hospitals, real estate, travel and vacation, and many more.

A TPV provider allows companies to prove that a consumer agreed to almost any kind of sale or other transaction, using either email or telephone or both, and obtain a legally binding instrument in the process.

. TPV 360 describes its verification offering as supporting methods including document verification, biometric authentication, and digital signatures.

== Advantages of using ==
Third-party verification adds an important element of proof to electronic transactions. For example, in a just-completed experimental study of consumer reactions to electronic contracts, over 80% of respondents agreed that a transaction was harder to dispute because the verification was made and held by an independent third party.

However, the actual telemarketing sales calls leading to third-party verification are typically not retained. Given this, marketing abuses are often difficult to identify, even with the use of third-party verification.

Currently, TPV elements are used in complex verification and approval of different web transactions in conjunction with address verification services provided by credit card companies, IP geolocation, phone type identifying (land line, mobile, VoIP etc.).
