= Track0 =

Track0 (pronounced 'track zero') is the area located at the start of a computer disk and is predominantly used to store information regarding the layout of the disk (the partition table) and executable code needed to boot an operating system. Track0 typically consists of the first 64 sectors of the disk (since each sector is normally 512 bytes, this corresponds to 32,768 bytes = 32KiB). Since the first sector of a disk is sector zero, the first 64 sectors are sectors 0 to 63.

The first sector of Track0 is known as the master boot record (MBR) and contains the initial code used to boot the operating system (bootstrap code). Near the end of the MBR is the Partition Table: a predefined structure containing the layout of the disk.

Track0 is also increasingly used to store licensing information for particular pieces of software because it is an area of the disk outside of the OS filesystem and not seen or used by most computer users (and therefore cannot be easily modified or replicated).

The origins of Track0 came about from the original specifications of PCs, where computer hard disks were defined in terms of Cylinders, Heads and Sectors (CHS system). In this context, Track0 was defined to be all the sectors on the first cylinder and first head. As with many (now legacy) original PC specifications, the terminology stuck and the first 63 sectors of modern hard disks are still referred to as Track0. Track0 is physically located on the outer edge of the disk platter.

Track0 is also the name of a terminate-and-stay-resident MS-DOS program that allows users to revive floppy disks with defective first tracks by swapping it with another track under the hood. With DOS, the first track of a floppy diskette is used to store system information, and it is known as the "system area". If the first track is defective, the whole disk becomes unusable, even if the other cylinders are fine. Track0 tries to work around this limitation. It is common for 1.4 inch floppies to become defective. Track0 runs as part of the [BIOS], and it takes 2 [Kilobytes] of memory.

While it was the first program of its kind, Track0 entered the game when the use of floppy disks had already declined. Even so, a plethora of similar programs appeared shortly after the release of Track0.
