= Steve Gibson (computer programmer) =

Computer enthusiast, software engineer and security researcher

Steve Maury Gibson
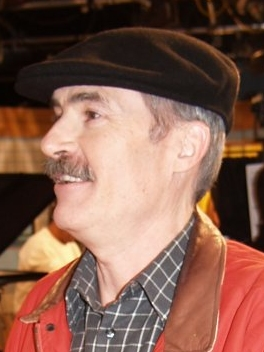
- Gibson in 2007
- Born: March 26, 1955 (age 71); Dayton, Ohio, U.S.
- Other name: "Steve Tiberius Gibson"
- Education: University of California, Berkeley
- Occupations: Software engineer and security analyst
- Known for: Security Now! podcast on TWiT.tv
- Website: www.grc.com

Steven Maury Gibson (born March 26, 1955) is an American software engineer, security researcher, and IT security proponent. In the early 1980s, he worked on light pen technology for use with Apple and Atari systems, and in 1985, founded Gibson Research Corporation, best known for its SpinRite software. He is also known for his work on the Security Now podcast.

== Early life ==
Gibson started working on computers as a teenager, and got his first computing job with Stanford University's artificial intelligence lab when he was 15 years old. He then studied electrical engineering and computer science at the University of California, Berkeley.

== Career ==
Gibson was hired as a programmer for California Pacific Computer Company in 1980, where he worked on copy protection for the company's products. He then founded Gibson Laboratories in Laguna Hills, California, in 1981, which developed a light pen for the Apple II, Atari, and other platforms before going out of business in 1983.

In 1985, Gibson founded Gibson Research Corporation (GRC), a computer software development firm, and from 1986 to 1993, he wrote the "Tech Talk" column for InfoWorld magazine.

In 1999, Gibson created one of the first adware removal programs, which he called OptOut. In 2001, he predicted that Microsoft's implementation of the SOCK_RAW protocol in the initial release of Windows XP would lead to widespread chaos by making it easier for Windows XP users to create denial of service (DoS) attacks. That year, his company's website was brought down by DoS attacks which continued for two weeks. Gibson blogged about the attacks and his (ultimately successful) efforts to track down the hacker. Three years after the Windows XP release, Microsoft limited raw socket support in Service Pack 2.

In 2005, he launched a weekly podcast called Security Now with Leo Laporte on TWiT.tv, with its archives hosted on GRC's website. In November 2024, the podcast hit 1,000 episodes, more than Gibson ever had intended.

In January 2006, Gibson raised the possibility that the Windows Metafile vulnerability bug was actually a backdoor intentionally engineered into the system. Stephen Toulouse of Microsoft Security Response Center and Mark Russinovich (who joined Microsoft six months later, in July) separately responded, stating that the bug appeared to be coding error, and that Gibson's reasoning was based upon Microsoft's abort procedure documentation being misleading.

In 2013, Gibson proposed SQRL as a way to simplify the process of authentication without the risk of revelation of information about the transaction to a third party.

== GRC products ==
GRC has created a number of utilities, most of which are freeware.

- DNS Benchmark, freeware that lets users test the performance of the domain name servers used by their internet service providers.
- Securable, freeware to test whether a pre-Windows 7 computer is 64-bit compatible. It also tells the user whether Data Execution Prevention is enabled.
- ShieldsUP, a free browser-based firewall testing service; one of the oldest available
- SpinRite, a hard disk scanning and data recovery utility first released in 1988. As of November 2026 the current version was 6.1, which was released on February 25, 2024, with version 7 in the works, which will move away from requiring DOS to boot, and will therefore be able to run on modern computers lacking UEFI Compatibility Support Modules. SpinRite is a commercial product, costing US$89 as of July 2021. Gibson's work on SpinRite has led to him being considered an expert on hard drive failure.
- Spoofarino, freeware released in 2006 and promised since the controversy over the launch of Windows XP in 2001, it enables users to test whether their internet service providers allow them to send forged or "spoofed" packets of data to Gibson's web site.
- Never10, standalone freeware program that toggles registry values in Windows 7, 8, and 8.1, which either disables or enables Microsoft's Get Windows 10 app and automatic OS upgrade. As of version 1.3, it also triggers the removal of any previously downloaded Windows 10 upgrade files as part of the disable function.
- InControl, stops automatic upgrading of Windows 10 and 11.
- InSpectre, a utility that examines a computer's vulnerability to the Meltdown and Spectre attacks.
- InitDisk, a tool that was developed for GRC's SpinRite (6.1), is a safe USB drive formatter that allows the user to reformat any USB device and make it bootable.
- ReadSpeed, an accurate benchmark for PC mass storage. The tool measures stability and repeatability to a precision of more than 4 significant digits.
- ValiDrive, a tool that validates whether or not USB flash drives or other Removable media are actually capable of storing the amount of data that they claim to.
- Ultra-High Entropy PRNG (Pseudo-Random Number Generator) which are critical to any and all computerized operation.
- SQRL Login Technology (Simple Quick Reliable Login, pronounced “squirrel”) is an open, free, intellectual property unencumbered, complete and practical system to cryptographically authenticate the identity of individuals across a network (..) it can replace all other systems while offering dramatic improvements in usability and security.

== Works ==
- — (1991). A Passion for Technology, 1986 - 1990 Cumulative Index and 1986. Aliso Viejo, California: Gibson Research Corporation. ISBN 978-1880814864. OCLC 1245623144. OL 28048112M.
- — (1991). A Passion for Technology 1987. Vol. 1. Aliso Viejo, California: Gibson Research Corporation. ISBN 978-1880814871. OCLC 1245623144.
- — (1991). A Passion for Technology 1988. Vol. 2. Aliso Viejo, California: Gibson Research Corporation. ISBN 978-1880814888. OCLC 1245623144. OL 27971346M – via Internet Archive.
- — (1991). A Passion for Technology 1989. Vol. 3. Aliso Viejo, California: Gibson Research Corporation. ISBN 978-1880814895. OCLC 1245623144. OL 27971314M.
- — (1991). A Passion for Technology 1990. Vol. 4. Aliso Viejo, California: Gibson Research Corporation. ISBN 978-1880814901. OCLC 1245623144.
