= Jim Hall (computer programmer) =

American programmer and FreeDOS founder

- Education: University of Wisconsin-River Falls
- Website: www.freedos.org/jhall/

Jim Hall (James F. Hall) is a computer programmer and advocate of free software, best known for his work on FreeDOS. Hall began writing the free replacement for the MS-DOS operating system in 1994 when he was still a physics student at the University of Wisconsin-River Falls. He remains active with FreeDOS, and is currently the coordinator for the project.

Hall created FreeDOS in response to Microsoft announcing end of support for MS-DOS in 1994, a year before Windows 95 was released. Prompted by a March 31, 1994 post on comp.os.msdos.misc asking if "anyone, for example GNU et al. ever considered writing a Public Domain DOS", Hall decided to garner support for a free version of DOS, written under a free or public domain model. In a June 29, 1994 post, Hall announced an effort to create a free DOS, called PD-DOS, writing:

A few months ago, I posted articles relating to starting a public domain version of DOS. The general support for this at the time was ong, and many people agreed with the statement, "start writing!" So, I have …

Announcing the first effort to produce a PD-DOS. I have written up a "manifest" describing the goals of such a project and an outline of the work, as well as a "task list" that shows exactly what needs to be written. I'll post those here, and let discussion follow.

If you are thinking about developing, or have ideas or suggestions for PD-DOS, I would appreciate direct email to me. If you just want to discuss the merits or morals of writing a PD-DOS, I'll leave that to the net. I'll check in from time to time to see how the discussion is going, and maybe contribute a little to what promises to be a very polarized debate! :->

I am excited about PD-DOS, and I am hoping I can get a group started!

Within a few weeks, other programmers including Pat Villani and Tim Norman joined the project. A kernel, the COMMAND.COM command line interpreter (shell) and core utilities were created by pooling code they had written or found available. Hall wrote over a dozen of the first DOS utilities for the project, mostly file and batch utilities. In a July 26, 1994 post, Hall announced the PD-DOS project had been renamed to "Free-DOS", having updated the project's goals to intend to distribute source code under the GNU General Public License. The project would later be renamed "FreeDOS", without the hyphen, after the publication of FreeDOS Kernel, by Pat Villani. Hall was the project's release coordinator from Beta1 until about Beta7, and also released the first alpha distribution of Free-DOS, as announced in a post on comp.os.msdos.misc. He is again the project coordinator since April 2011 after Pat Villani's departure, and subsequent death in August of the same year.

Hall is also the original developer of GNU Robots, but he is no longer active on this project and has since handed maintainership over to Tim Northover. It is now being developed by Bradley Smith.
