= DOSEMU =

DOS compatibility layer for Linux

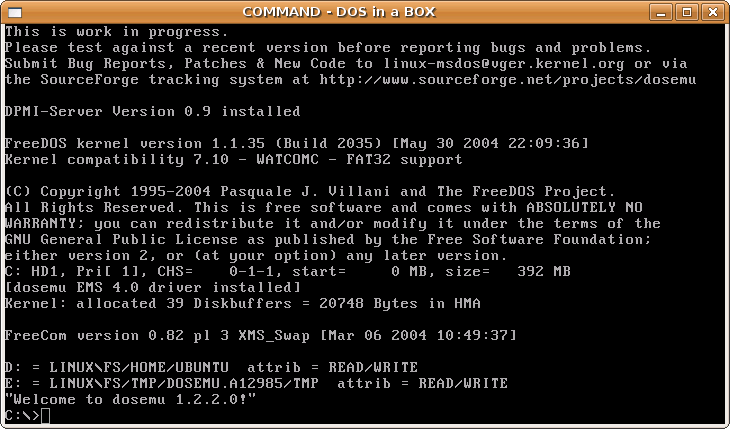
- DOSEMU Running on C:\
- Original author: DOSEMU Team
- Initial release: September 3, 1992; 33 years ago
- Final release: 1.4.0 / May 5, 2007; 19 years ago
- Operating system: Linux
- Platform: IA-32, x86-64
- Type: Compatibility layer
- License: GPL
- Website: www.dosemu.org
- Repository: sf.net/p/dosemu/code/

dosemu2
- Preview release: 2.0pre9-2 / 9 April 2024; 2 years ago
- Website: dosemu2.github.io/dosemu2/
- Repository: github.com/dosemu2/dosemu2

DOSEMU, stylized as dosemu, is a compatibility layer software package that enables DOS operating systems (e.g., MS-DOS, DR-DOS, FreeDOS) and application software to run atop Linux on x86-based PCs (IBM PC compatible computers).

== Features ==
It uses a combination of hardware-assisted virtualization features and high-level emulation. It can thus achieve nearly native speed for 8086-compatible DOS operating systems and applications on x86 compatible processors, and for DOS Protected Mode Interface (DPMI) applications on x86 compatible processors as well as on x86-64 processors. DOSEMU includes an 8086 processor emulator for use with real-mode applications in x86-64 long mode.

DOSEMU is only available for x86 and x86-64 Linux systems (Linux 3.15 x86-64 systems cannot enter DPMI by default. This is fixed in 3.16).

DOSEMU is an option for people who need or want to continue to use legacy DOS software; in some cases virtualisation is good enough to drive external hardware such as device programmers connected to the parallel port. According to its manual, "dosemu" is a user-level program which uses certain special features of the Linux kernel and the 80386 processor to run DOS in a DOS box. The DOS box, relying on a combination of hardware and software, has these abilities:

- Virtualize all input-output and processor control instructions
- Supports the word size and addressing modes of the iAPX86 processor family's "real mode", while still running within the full protected mode environment
- Trap all DOS and BIOS system calls and emulate such calls as needed for proper operation and good performance
- Simulate a hardware environment over which DOS programs are accustomed to having control.
- Provide DOS services through native Linux services; for example, dosemu can provide a virtual hard disk drive which is actually a Linux directory hierarchy.
- API-level support for Packet driver, IPX, Berkeley sockets (dosnet).

== See also ==
- Comparison of platform virtualization software
- Virtual DOS machine
- DOSBox
- Wine
- FreeDOS
