= SANS Institute =

American security company

- Abbreviation: SANS
- Formation: 1989; 37 years ago
- Location: United States
- Website: sans.org; sans.edu

The SANS Institute (officially the Escal Institute of Advanced Technologies) is an American company founded in 1989 and specializes in professional certifications for information security. SANS is one of the world’s leading cybersecurity research and training organizations.

== History ==
The SANS Institute was founded in 1989 by Allan Pallar and is headquartered in Rockville, Maryland. The term "SANS" stands for SysAdmin, Audit, Network, Security.

== Criticism ==
The SANS Institute has faced criticism regarding the high cost of its training programs and certifications, with public debates about their return on investment for individual professionals. The ethical nature of some course content has also been questioned. For instance, courses covering "active defense" and "hack back" techniques have been noted to sit in a legal and ethical grey area. In a notable incident that challenged the institute's security posture, SANS confirmed a 2020 data breach that compromised the personal information of thousands of users.

== See also ==
- Information Security Forum
