= NewDos/80 =

- Developer: Apparat, Inc.
- Working state: Historic
- Source model: Closed source
- Initial release: 1980; 46 years ago
- Available in: English
- Supported platforms: TRS-80
- Kernel type: Monolithic
- Default user interface: Command-line interface

NewDos/80 is a third-party operating system for the Radio Shack TRS-80 line of microcomputers released in 1980. NewDos/80 was developed by Apparat, Inc., of Denver, Colorado. NewDos/80 version 2.0 was released in August 1981. It runs on the TRS-80 Model I and Model III.

== Overview ==
The operating system had additional commands and features that were not available in TRSDOS, the native operating system for TRS-80 computers. NewDos/80 allowed TRS-80 computers to take advantage of advances in floppy disk storage that went beyond the initial 87.5KB 35-track, single-density, single-sided format. The system also corrected issues that early versions of TRSDOS had with arbitrarily losing data due to errors in how it communicated with the contemporary TRS-80 disk drives' 1771 disk controller.

NewDos/80 had many options for specifying specific low-level disk configurations. Settings such as diskette formats, disk drive types, track geometry and controllers could be configured using the PDRIVE command. In version 2.1, Apparat added support for hard disk drives via an external bus adapter.

Additionally, NewDOS/80 incorporated a software fix for the infamous hardware "keybounce" problem associated with the TRS-80 Model I. Without such a fix, keyboard keys would often repeat multiple times when struck. This fix was not built into TRS-DOS that came with the computer, so users were forced to load a separate debounce utility every time they booted.

NewDos/80 was written by Cliff Ide and Jason Matthews. Ide was the primary author of NewDos in all of its incarnations, Matthews wrote "patches" for various applications such as Scripsit and VisiCalc. Ide later retired and Matthews went on to other projects in the software business.

== Commands ==
The following is a list of NewDos/80 commands:

NewDos/80 commands and counterparts in other operating systems
Command	MS-DOS, OS/2, Windows	UNIX, Unix-like
APPEND	type file1 >> file2	cat file >> file2
ATTRIB	attrib	chmod
AUTO	AUTOEXEC.BAT	~/.profile or ~/.login or /etc/rc*
BASIC2		
BLINK		
BOOT		
BREAK		
CHAIN		
CHNON		
CLEAR		
CLOCK	prompt $t *	in some shells: PS1="...\t..." *
CLS	cls	clear
COPY	copy	cp
CREATE		
DATE	date	date
DEBUG	debug	gdb
DIR	dir	ls
DO		
DUMP		
ERROR		
FORMAT	format	mkfs
FORMS		
FREE	chkdsk	df
HIMEM		
JKL	Prt Sc	
KILL	del	rm
LC		
LCDVR		
LIB		
LIST	type	cat
LOAD program	program	program
MDBORT		
MDRET		
PAUSE	pause	read
PDRIVE		
PRINT	type file > prn	lpr
PROT	attrib	chmod
PURGE	del /P	rm -i
R		!!
RENAME	ren or rename	mv
ROUTE		
SETCOM		stty
STMT	echo	echo
PDRIVE		
SYSTEM		
TIME	time	date +%T
VERIFY		
WRDIRP		

== Reception ==
While criticizing NEWDOS's "nearly incomprehensible documentation", Jerry Pournelle of BYTE wrote in 1980 that it was "a much better operating system" than the "needlessly complex" TRSDOS and stated that "Tandy ought to be marketing NEWDOS+ themselves". A 1982 review in the magazine stated that NEWDOS/80 2.0 "may be the most powerful operating system for any microcomputer", with "much better" documentation, albeit not written for novices.

== See also ==
- List of DOS commands
- List of Unix commands
