= OS-9 =

Real-time operating system

- Developer: Microware LP (2013–present); Radisys (2001–2013); Microware (1979–2001)
- Written in: C, Assembly language
- Working state: Current
- Source model: Closed source
- Initial release: 1979; 47 years ago
- Latest release: 6.1 / November 14, 2017; 9 years ago
- Marketing target: high-performance, high-availability real-time software solution for advanced industrial automation & control, medical instrumentation, aerospace and transportation systems
- Available in: English
- Supported platforms: Motorola 6809, Motorola 680x0 CPUs, ColdFire, SuperH, ARM/XScale, MIPS, PowerPC, Intel x86 architecture
- Kernel type: Real-time kernel
- Default user interface: CLI in all versions, some platforms support a GUI
- License: Proprietary
- Official website: www.microware.com

OS-9 is a family of real-time, process-based, multitasking, multi-user operating systems, developed in the 1980s, originally by Microware Systems Corporation for the Motorola 6809 microprocessor. It was purchased by Radisys Corp in 2001, and was purchased again in 2013 by its current owner Microware LP.

The OS-9 family was popular for general-purpose computing and remains in use in commercial embedded systems and amongst hobbyists. Today, OS-9 is a product name used by both a Motorola 68000-series machine language OS and a portable (PowerPC, x86, ARM, MIPS, SH4, etc.) version written in C, originally known as OS-9000.

== History ==
The first version ("OS-9 Level One"), which dates back to 1979–1980, was written in assembly language for the Motorola 6809 CPU, and all of its processes ran within the 64KB address space of the CPU without a memory management unit. It was developed as a supporting operating system for the BASIC09 project, contracted for by Motorola as part of the 6809 development. A later 6809 version ("Level Two") takes advantage of memory mapping hardware, supported up to 2 MB of memory (ca. 1980) in most implementations, and included a GUI on some platforms.

In 1983, OS-9/6809 was ported to Motorola 68000 assembly language and extended (called OS-9/68K); and a still later (1989) version was rewritten mostly in C for further portability. The portable version was initially called OS-9000 and was released for 80386 PC systems around 1989, then ported to PowerPC around 1995. These later versions lack the memory mapping facilities of OS-9/6809 Level Two simply because they do not need them. They used a single flat address space that all processes share; memory mapping hardware, if present, is mostly used to ensure that processes access only memory they have the right to access. The 680x0 and 80386 (and later) MPUs all directly support far more than 1 MB of memory in any case.

As a consequence of early pervasive design decisions taking advantage of the easily used reentrant object code capabilities of the 6809 processor, programs intended for OS-9 are required to be reentrant; compilers produce reentrant code automatically and assemblers for OS-9 offer considerable support for it. OS-9 also uses position-independent code and data because the 6809 also supports it directly; compilers and assemblers support position independence. The OS-9 kernel loads programs (including shared code), and allocates data, wherever sufficient free space is available in the memory map. This allows the entire OS and all applications to be placed in ROM or Flash memory, and eases memory management requirements when programs are loaded into RAM and run. Programs, device drivers, and I/O managers under OS-9 are all 'modules' and can be dynamically loaded and unloaded (subject to link counts) as needed.

OS-9/6809 runs on Motorola EXORbus systems using the Motorola 6809, SS-50 Bus and SS-50C bus systems from companies such as SWTPC, Tano, Gimix, Midwest Scientific, and Smoke Signal Broadcasting, STD-bus 6809 systems from several suppliers, personal computers such as the Fujitsu FM-11, FM-8, FM-7 and FM-77, Hitachi MB-S1, and many others.

System Industries, a third-party provider of DEC compatible equipment, used a 68B09E processor running OS9 in its QIC (quarter-inch cartridge) tape backup controllers in VAX installations.

The best known hardware (due to its low price and broad distribution) was the TRS-80 Color Computer (CoCo) and the similar Dragon series. Even on the CoCo, a quite minimalist hardware platform, it was possible under OS-9/6809 Level One to have more than one interactive user running concurrently (for example, one on the console keyboard, another in the background, and perhaps a third interactively via a serial connection) as well as several other non-interactive processes. One system, the Positron 9000, was positioned as a multi-user system for educational use, offering Microware's BASIC and Pascal environments, fitted with 64 KB to 512 KB of RAM, and featuring four to twelve serial ports. Responsiveness was reportedly impacted by multi-user operations in the system's minimal configuration, however. A second processor implementation of OS-9 for the BBC Micro was produced by Cumana. It included on-board RAM, SCSI hard disk interface and a MC68008 processor.

OS-9 was also ported to the Commodore SP-9000 or SuperPET, which had a 6809 in addition to the 6502 of the base 8032 model, as well as 64 KB more. The Toronto PET Users Group sponsored a HW/SW project which included a daughter board with an MMU as well as the OS-9 distribution disks. With two processors, 96 KB, a 25×80 screen and serial, parallel and IEEE-488 ports and many peripherals this was one of the most capable OS-9 systems available.

OS-9's multi-user and multi-tasking capabilities make it usable as a general-purpose interactive computer system. Many third-party interactive applications have been written for it, such as the Dynacalc spreadsheet, the VED text formatter, and the Stylograph and Screditor-3 WYSIWYG word processors. TSC's nroff emulating formatter was ported to OS-9 by MicroWay, as well.

In mid 1980s, OS-9 was selected for the CD-i operating system. Around the same time, Microsoft approached Microware for acquisition of the company primarily because it was attracted by CD-RTOS, the CD-i operating system. The negotiation failed and no deal was made; Microware decided to remain independent.

In late 1980s, Microware released OS-9000, a more portable version of the operating system. The vast majority of the operating system kernel was rewritten in C leaving a handful of hardware-dependent parts in assembly language. A few "more advanced features" were added such as tree-like kernel module name space. OS-9000 was initially ported to the Motorola 680x0 family CPUs, Intel 80386, and PowerPC. The OS-9000/680x0 was a marketing failure and withdrawn very quickly, probably because few customers wanted to try the fatter and slower operating system over the existing OS-9/680x0 proven record of stability. Microware later started calling all of its operating systems — including what had been originally called OS-9000 — simply OS-9, and started shifting its business interest towards portable consumer device markets such as cellphones, car navigation, and multimedia.

In late 1980s and early 1990s, the Character Generators computers used in Broadcast Systems used OS-9 and OS-9000 extensively. The now defunct Pesa Electronica used OS-9 on their CGs such as CG 4722 and CG4733.

== Name conflicts and court decisions ==
In 1999, nineteen years after the first release of OS-9, Apple Computer released Mac OS 9. Microware sued Apple that year for trademark infringement, although a judge ruled that there would be little chance for confusion between the two. Some Macintosh users who are unaware of Microware's lesser known OS-9 have posted to the comp.os.os9 newsgroup not realizing what OS-9 is.

In 2001, RadiSys purchased Microware to acquire the Intel IXP-1200 network processor resources. This acquisition infused Microware with capital and allowed Microware to continue OS-9 development and support.

On February 21, 2013, Microware LP (a partnership formed by Freestation of Japan, Microsys Electronics of Germany and RTSI LLC of the USA) announced that they signed an Asset Purchase Agreement to buy the rights to the names Microware, OS-9 and all assets from RadiSys.

== Technology ==
=== Modern and archaic design ===
OS-9 (especially the 68k version and thereafter) clearly distinguishes itself from the prior generation of embedded operating systems in many aspects.

- Runs on 8-bit, 16-bit, and 32-bit CPUs.
- Clear separation between user mode and supervisor (kernel) mode.
- Dynamic use of individually and separately built software components (executable program images and kernel modules) rather than a statically linked single monolithic image.
- Unix-like process name-space model (not memory model) and user shell program.
- Clear separation between hardware independent (e.g. file managers) and hardware dependent (e.g. device drivers) layers.

When compared with more modern operating systems:

- The kernel is written entirely in assembly language (OS-9/68K version only) and C (portable version to other architectures) using simple internal data structures, reducing flexibility and improvement scope while improving determinability required for real-time operating systems.
- Performance was also affected for some operations, but assembly language helped with the speed issue.
- Systems without a memory management unit (MMU) have no memory protection against illegal access, nor per-process memory protection, while systems with an MMU can have memory protection enabled. The module controlling the MMU can be included or omitted by the system integrator to enable or disable memory protection. This allows OS-9 to run on older systems which do not include an MMU.
- Older versions of OS-9 do not support POSIX threads, while all OS-9 supported processors support POSIX threads.
- No SMP support for multiple sockets, cores, or hardware threads in the same OS-9 instance (can run as a RTOS on one of the cores of dual core processors like Core Duo and Core 2 Duo, when Linux is running on the other core doing general purpose tasks).

=== Task scheduling ===
OS-9's real-time kernel allows multiple independent applications to execute simultaneously through task switching and inter-process communication facilities. All OS-9 programs run as processes containing at least one lightweight process (thread) but may contain an effectively unlimited number of threads. Within a process, these lightweight processes share memory, I/O paths, and other resources in accordance with the POSIX threads specification and API. OS-9 schedules the threads using a fixed-priority preemptive scheduling algorithm with round-robin scheduling within each priority. Time slicing is supported. The priority levels can be divided into a range that supports aging and a higher-priority range that uses strict priority scheduling. Each process can access any system resource by issuing the appropriate OS-9 service request. At every scheduling point, OS-9 compares the priority of the thread at the head of the active queue to the priority of the current thread. It context switches to the thread on the active queue if its priority is higher than the current processes' priority. Aging artificially increases the effective priority of threads in the active queue as time passes. At defined intervals, time slicing returns the current thread to the active queue behind other threads at the same priority.

=== Kernel modules ===
- Kernel – Contains task switching, memory allocation, and most non-I/O calls
- IOMAN – Handles I/O calls to various file managers and drivers.
- File managers basic set:
  - SCF, Serial files (serial devices)
  - RBF, Random block (disk devices)
  - SBF, Sequential block (tape Devices)
  - NFM, NULL devices (USB and other devices)
  - MFM, Message
  - SPF, Stacked Protocol devices ( Networking)
  - PCF, PC FAT files
  - PIPEMAN, Pipe manager
  - Modman - Memory module directories
- SSM – System security (MMU handling)
- Cache – Cache handling,
- VectXXX – Vector / PIC handler
- FPU – Floating point emulation
- Align – Address alignment fault handler

=== Commands ===
The following list of commands is supported by the OS-9 shell.

Shell built-in commands

- chd
- chx
- kill
- w
- wait
- setenv
- unsetenv
- setpr
- logout
- profile
- ex
- -e
- -ne
- -p
- -p=<str>
- -np
- -t
- -nt
- -v
- -nv
- -x
- -nx

Utilities for operating system functions

- attr
- copy
- date
- deiniz
- del
- deldir
- dsave
- dump
- echo
- fixmod
- free
- ident
- iniz
- link
- list
- load
- makdir
- mdir
- merge
- mfree
- pd
- pr
- printenv
- procs
- rename
- save
- shell
- setime
- sleep
- tee
- tmode
- touch
- unlink

System management utilities

- backup
- dcheck
- devs
- format
- frestore
- fsave
- irqs
- login
- os9gen
- tsmon
- xmode

General utilities

- binex
- build
- cfp
- cmp
- code
- compress
- count
- edt
- exbin
- expand
- grep
- help
- make
- qsort
- tr
- umacs

== Comparisons with Unix ==
OS-9's notion of processes and I/O paths is quite similar to that of Unix in nearly all respects, but there are some significant differences. Firstly, the file system is not a single tree, but instead is a forest with each tree corresponding to a device. Second, OS-9 does not have a Unix-style fork() system call—instead it has a system call which creates a process running a specified program, performing much the same function as a fork-exec or a spawn. Additionally, OS-9 processes keep track of two "current directories" rather than just one; the "current execution directory" is where it will by default look first to load programs to run (which is similar to the use of PATH environment variable under UNIX). The other is the current data directory.

Another difference is that in OS-9, grandparent directories can be indicated by repeating periods three or more times, without any intervening slashes (a feature also found in 4DOS/4OS2/TC/4NT). For example, ..../file in OS-9, is similar to ../../../file in Unix. But . and .., with just one or two periods, each work the same in both OS-9 and Unix.

OS-9 has had a modular design from the beginning, influenced by notions of the designers of the 6809 and how they expected software would be distributed in the future (see the three-part series of articles in January–March 1979 Byte by Terry Ritter, et al. of Motorola who designed the CPU).

The module structure requires more explanation: OS-9 keeps a "module directory", a memory-resident list of all modules that are in memory either by having been loaded, or by having been found in ROM during an initial scan at boot time. When one types a command to the OS-9 shell, it will look first in the current module directory for a module of the specified name and will use it (and increase its link count) if found, or it will look on disk for an appropriately named file if not. In OS-9/6809 and OS-9/68000, the module directory is flat, but OS-9000 made the module directory tree-structured. The OS-9000 shell looks in one's alternative module directory for a MODPATH environment variable, analogous to the PATH variable in all versions, indicating the sequence of module directories in which to look for pre-loaded modules.

Modules are not only used to hold programs, but can also be created on the fly to hold data, and are the way in which OS-9 supports shared memory. OS-9/non-68000 supports POSIX threads. A single process can start any number of threads.

== Status ==
OS-9 has faded from popular use, though Microware LP does still support it and it does run on modern architectures such as ARM and x86. The compiler provided, Ultra C/C++, supports C89, but supports neither C99 nor C++98. Ultra C++ does provide limited support for C++ templates. It is also supported by popular SSL/TLS libraries such as openSSL and OpenSSH. Recently CLANG/LLVM has been ported to OS-9 for PPC & ARM architecture CPU's.

- A Version of OS-9 running Steve Adams' G-Windows is present on semiconductor wafer scrubbers manufactured by Ontrak Systems / Lam Research. Thousands of these systems are in use today, however, the software running on them dates to 1999 when the last version was created to handle Y2K issues.
- Versions of OS-9/68K ran on a wide variety of 68000 family platforms, including the X68000 in Japan, some personal computers intended by their designers as upgrades from the Color Computer (e.g., the 68070 and 68340-based MM/1, and on other computers from Frank Hogg Laboratories, PEP Modular Computers, and Delmar Co.) It was also ported to the Atari ST by Recc-o-ware in the early 1990s, and was distributed by Cumana in Europe. A port for 68000-based Apple Macintoshes distributed by Ultrascience exists. A port to the Amiga by Digby Tarvin is also purported to exist.
- OS-9/68K is mandated by Caltrans to be used in the 2070-1B and 2070-1E controller cards, and so ends up being used to run many North American traffic signal control systems.
- OS-9/68K is also found in some other embedded applications, including the Quanta Delta television broadcast character generator, still in production by ScanLine Technologies in Utah. While the user-level interface code on this system started at boot time, there was a hidden, undocumented keyboard sequence that would provide a user with a root shell prompt in a scroll window on the device's edit-channel monitor.
- In the embedded market, where OS-9 has found application in such devices as the Fairlight CMI synthesizers, robotics, in-car navigation systems, and Philips' Compact Disc-Interactive (CD-i) industry standard.
- The TRS-80 Color Computer (and clones) still has users and an annual conference in Chicago; as of 2018 the 27th Annual "Last" Chicago CoCoFEST was scheduled for April 21–22, 2018. A group of Canadian programmers rewrote OS-9/6809 Level II for the CoCo 3 (w/ address translation hardware) for efficiency, and to take advantage of the native mode of the Hitachi 6309. Today's serious CoCo users now typically have replaced the 68B09E in the CoCo 3 with an Hitachi 63B09E and run the rewrite, called NitrOS-9. The combination is surprisingly fast, considering that it runs on an expressly low cost, 8-bit computer system.
- Gary Becker's CoCo3 FPGA is a synthesized TRS-80 Color Computer which runs NitrOS-9 on an Altera DE-1 development board. The core 6809 CPU was designed by John Kent and is currently running at 25 MHz.
- OS-9000/80x86 can be run on PC-type machines built around the Intel x86 CPUs. OS-9000 has also been ported to the PowerPC, MIPS, some versions of Advanced RISC Machines' ARM processor, and some of the Hitachi SH family of processors.
- The DigiCart/II Plus audio playback unit runs OS-9/68K. It is a solid state replacement for radio station style cart players. These units are used in radio and at places like Walt Disney World where they play park announcements.
- German electronics manufacturer Eltec has been manufacturing the Eurocom-model CPU boards for industrial purposes since the late 1970s, starting with the 6802 and 6809 Eurocom-1 and Eurocom-2, and onwards with 68K, and derivative, CPU boards up to today. The modern boards can be delivered with a range of operating systems, amongst which is OS-9.
- Omron used OS-9 in their NS series HMI panels. However, for their new NA series, Omron selected Windows Embedded Compact 7. Omron indicated that with OS-9 nearly all the drivers, for example for a USB stick, had to be written by Omron.
- OS-9000/SH4 can be found in loader (inside KIWI-format container LOADING.KWI) on Map CD/DVD for old automotive GPS navigation systems made by Matsushita for Japan domestical market.
