= VERSAdos =

- Developer: Motorola Microsystems Division
- Working state: Discontinued
- Initial release: 1980s; 44 years ago
- Available in: English
- Supported platforms: Motorola 68000
- Default user interface: Command-line interface
- License: Proprietary

VERSAdos is an operating system dating back to the early 1980s for use on the Motorola 68000 development system called the EXORmacs which featured the VERSAbus and an array of option cards. They were typically connected to CDC Phoenix disk drives running one to four 14-inch platters. The EXORmacs was used to emulate a 680xx processor in-circuit, speeding development of 680xx based systems. It also hosted several compilers and assemblers.

VERSAdos and the EXORmacs were produced by Motorola's Microsystems Division.

== Overview ==
VERSAdos was a real-time, multi-user operating system. It was the follow on product to the single user MDOS that ran the 6800 development system called the EXORciser.

Both systems features a harness with a CPU socket compatible connector.

A Modula 2 compiler was ported to VERSAdos.

=== Commands ===
The following list of commands and utilities are supported by VERSAdos.

- ^
- ACCT
- ARGUMENTS
- ASSIGN
- BACKUP
- BATCH
- BSTOP
- BTERM
- BUILDS
- BYE
- CANCEL
- CHAIN
- CLOSE
- CONFIG
- CONNECT
- CONTINUE
- COPY
- CREF
- DATE
- DEFAULTS
- DEL
- DIR
- DMT
- DUMP
- DUMPANAL
- ELIMINATE
- EMFGEN
- END
- FREE
- HELP
- INIT
- LIB
- LIST
- LOAD
- LOGOFF
- MBLM
- MERGEOS
- MIGR
- MT
- NEWS
- NOARGUMENTS
- NOVALID
- OFF
- OPTION
- PASS
- PASSWORD
- PATCH
- PROCEED
- PRTDUMP
- QUERY
- R?
- RENAME
- REPAIR
- RETRY
- SCRATCH
- SECURE
- SESSIONS
- SNAPSHOT
- SPL
- SPOOL
- SRCCOM
- START
- STOP
- SWORD
- SYSANAL
- TERMINATE
- TIME
- TRANSFER
- UPLOADS
- USE
- VALID

== See also ==
- CP/M-68K
