= New name =

New name may refer to:

- Nomen novum in biological nomenclature
- Name change, a legal act by a person of adopting a new name
- Geographical renaming

== See also ==
- Rename (disambiguation)
- Renaming (disambiguation)
- Rebranding
- Newco
- New (surname)
