= DSW =

DSW may refer to:

== Personnel ==
- Diving salvage warfare specialist, a United States Navy enlisted warfare designator
- Doctor of Social Work

== Organisations ==
- Deep South Wrestling, a pro wrestling promotion that was a developmental territory of World Wrestling Entertainment
- DSW ("Designer Shoe Warehouse"), big-box footwear retailer, headquartered in Columbus, Ohio
- German School Washington, D.C. (DSW) (German: Deutsche Schule Washington, D.C.)
- German Foundation for World Population (German: Deutsche Stiftung Weltbevölkerung), an international nongovernmental organization based in Germany

== Computing ==
- Day–Stout–Warren algorithm for balancing binary search trees
- dsw (command), an obsolete Unix command.

== Other ==
- DSW, the SAME code for a Dust Storm Warning
- The Doon School Weekly, a student newspaper produced by the boys of The Doon School
