= FASTOPEN =

- Developers: Microsoft, Digital Research, Novell
- Initial release: 1987, 37–38 years ago
- Operating system: MS-DOS, DR DOS, SISNE plus
- Type: Command

In computing, FASTOPEN is a terminate-and-stay-resident command, introduced in MS-DOS version 3.3, that provides accelerated access to frequently-used files and directories. The command is also available in SISNE plus.

== Overview ==
The command works with hard disks, but not with diskettes (probably for security when swapping) or with network drives (probably because such drives do not offer block-level access, only file-level access).

It is possible to specify for which drives FASTOPEN should operate, how many files and directories should be cached on each (10 by default, up to 999 total), how many regions for each drive should be cached and whether the cache should be located in conventional or expanded memory.

If a disk defragmenter tool is used, or if Windows Explorer is to move files or directories, while FASTOPEN is installed, it is necessary to reboot the computer afterwards, because FASTOPEN would remember the old position of files and directories, causing MS-DOS to display garbage if e.g. "DIR" was performed.

DR DOS 6.0 includes an implementation of the FASTOPEN command. FASTOPEN is also part of the Windows XP MS-DOS subsystem to maintain MS-DOS and MS OS/2 version 1.x compatibility. It is not available on Windows XP 64-Bit Edition.

The "fastopen" name has since been reused for various other "accelerating" software products.

== See also ==
- FASTOPEN (CONFIG.SYS directive)
- SmartDrive
- List of DOS commands
