= Del (command) =

Command in various operating systems

del / erase
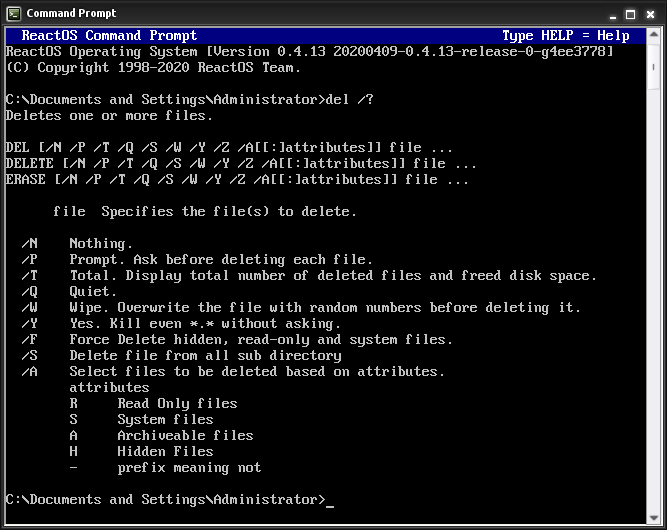
- The ReactOS del command
- Developers: DEC, Microware, Microsoft, IBM, DR, Datalight, Novell, JP Software, ReactOS Contributors
- Operating system: RT-11, OS/8, RSX-11, OpenVMS, DOS, OS-9, MSX-DOS, FlexOS, SISNE plus, OS/2, Windows, ReactOS, KolibriOS, SymbOS, DexOS
- Platform: Cross-platform
- Type: Command

In computing, del (or erase) is a command in command-line interpreters (shells) such as COMMAND.COM, cmd.exe, 4DOS, NDOS, 4OS2, 4NT and Windows PowerShell. It is used to delete one or more files or directories from a file system.

== Implementations ==
The command is available for various operating systems including DOS, Microware OS-9, IBM OS/2, Microsoft Windows and ReactOS. It is analogous to the Unix rm command and to the Stratus OpenVOS delete_file and delete_dircommands.

DEC RT-11, OS/8, RSX-11, and OpenVMS also provide the delete command which can be contracted to del. AmigaDOS and TSC FLEX provide a delete command as well.

The erase command is supported by Tim Paterson's SCP 86-DOS. On MS-DOS, the command is available in versions 1 and later. It is also available in the open-source MS-DOS emulator DOSBox.

Datalight ROM-DOS also includes an implementation of the del and erase commands.

While Digital Research DR-DOS supports del and erase as well, it also supports the shorthand form era, which derived from CP/M. In addition to this, the DR-DOS command processor also supports delq/eraq. These are shorthand forms for the del/era/erase command with an assumed /Q parameter (for 'Query') given as well.

THEOS/OASIS and FlexOS provide only the erase command.

In PowerShell, del and erase are predefined command aliases for the Remove-Item cmdlet which serves the same purpose.

== Syntax ==
>del filename
>erase filename

== See also ==
- deltree
- rmdir
- List of DOS commands
- List of Unix commands
