= SISNE plus =

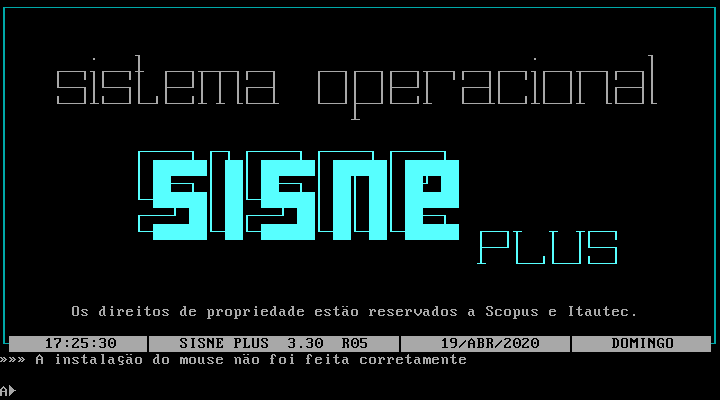
- SISNE Plus V3.30 R05
- Developer: Itautec, Scopus Tecnologia
- OS family: DOS
- Working state: Discontinued
- Source model: Closed-source
- Initial release: 1988; 37 years ago
- Available in: Portuguese
- Platforms: x86
- Kernel type: Monolithic kernel
- Userland: DOS API
- Default user interface: Command-line interface (COMMAND.COM)
- License: Proprietary
- Official website: www.itautec.com.br

SISNE plus is a DOS 3.3 compatible clone created by Itautec and Scopus Tecnologia in Brazil prior to the end of the Market Reserve in 1991, which, at that time, forbade the importation of electronic equipment and software for general use. The system was sold with PC/XT compatible Itautec IS 30 computers and with Itautec IS 386 computers. With the widespread use of MS-DOS after the importations were allowed, the SISNE plus operating system was discontinued.

Before SISNE plus, Scopus developed and offered SISNE. Version 1.6 was compatible to DOS 1.1 and had the same user interface as CP/M-80.

== Releases ==
SISNE plus version history
Version	Status	Date
3.30 R02	Discontinued	1988
3.30 R05	Discontinued	1990

== Commands ==
The following list of commands are supported by SISNE plus 3.30 R05.

- AJUDA
- APPEND
- ASSIGN
- ATTRIB
- BACKUP
- BEEP
- BRASCII
- BREAK
- BUFIM
- CALL
- CD
- CHDIR
- CHKDSK
- CLS
- COM
- COMENT
- COMMAND
- COMP
- CONV
- COP
- COPIA
- COPY
- CTTY
- DAT
- DATA
- DATE
- DEL
- DIR
- DIRET
- DISKCOMP
- DISKCOPY
- ECHO
- ECO
- EDITOR
- ERASE
- EXIT
- FASTOPEN
- FBACKIM
- FBACKUP
- FDISK
- FFORMAT
- FIND
- FOR
- FORMAT
- FRESTIM
- FRESTORE
- GOTO
- GRAFTABL
- GRAPHICS
- GRAVA
- HOR
- HORA
- ICC
- IF
- IMP86
- JOIN
- LABEL
- LAND
- LISTA
- MD
- MENU
- MKDIR
- MODE
- MORE
- MOS
- MOSTRA
- PATH
- PAU
- PAUSA
- PAUSE
- PREAJUDA
- PRINT
- PROMPT
- RD
- RECOVER
- REM
- REN
- RENAME
- RENOMAIA
- REPLACE
- RESTORE
- RMDIR
- RX86
- SET
- SHARE
- SHIFT
- SORT
- SUBST
- SUP
- SUPRIME
- SYS
- TECLAS
- TIME
- TREE
- TRUNC
- TX86
- TYPE
- VER
- VERIFY
- VOL
- XCOPY

== See also ==
- Comparison of DOS operating systems
- Timeline of DOS operating systems
- List of DOS commands
- SOX (operating system)
