= Rename =

Rename may refer to:

- Rename (computing), rename of a file on a computer
- RENAME (command), command to rename a file in various operating systems
- Rename (relational algebra), unary operation in relational algebra
- Company renaming, rename of a product
- Name change, rename of a person
- Geographical renaming, rename of a geographical location

== See also ==
- Renaming (disambiguation)
