= INtime =

Real-time operating system

INtime RTOS / INtime for Windows
- Developer: TenAsys Corporation
- OS family: Real-time operating systems
- Working state: Current
- Source model: Closed Source
- Initial release: 1997
- Latest release: 6.3 / July 2017
- Marketing target: Embedded systems
- Available in: English, Japanese
- Platforms: 80386 or higher
- Official website: www.tenasys.com/intime

The INtime Real Time Operating System (RTOS) family is based on a 32-bit RTOS conceived to run time-critical operations cycle-times as low as 50μs. INtime RTOS runs on single-core, hyper-threaded, and multi-core x86 PC platforms from Intel and AMD. It supports two binary compatible usage configurations; INtime for Windows, where the INtime RTOS runs alongside Microsoft Windows®, and INtime Distributed RTOS, where INtime runs one.

Like its iRMX predecessors, INtime is a real-time operating system, and like DOSRMX and iRMX for Windows, it runs concurrently with a general-purpose operating system on a single hardware platform.

== History ==
=== Initial Release ===
INtime 1.0 was originally introduced in 1997 in conjunction with the Windows NT operating system. Since then it has been upgraded to include support for all subsequent protected-mode Microsoft Windows platforms, Windows XP to Windows 10.

INtime can also be used as a stand-alone RTOS. INtime binaries are able to run unchanged when running on a stand-alone node of the INtime RTOS. Unlike Windows, INtime can run on an Intel 80386 or equivalent processor. Current versions of the Windows operating system generally require at least a Pentium level processor in order to boot and execute.

=== Version 2.2 ===
After spinning off from Radisys in 2000 development work on INtime continued at TenAsys Corporation. In 2003 TenAsys released version 2.2 of INtime.

Notable features of version 2.2 include:

- Real-time Shared Libraries, or RSLs, which are the functional equivalent of the Windows Dynamically Loaded Libraries, or DLLs.
- Support for the development of USB clients, and USB host control drivers for OHCI, UHCI and EHCI (USB 2.0) devices.
- A new timing acquisition and display application called ""INscope"" is released.
