= Apparat =

Apparat can mean:

- The bureaucratic apparatus, staffed by Apparatchiki, in the Soviet Union
- Apparat (musician), Sascha Ring, a German electronic musician
- Apparat Organ Quartet, an Icelandic band
- Apparat Singles Group, a fictional comic book publisher
- Apparat, Inc., a defunct computer software and hardware company

== See also ==
- Aparat, an Iranian video sharing service
