= Mv (Unix) =

Shell command for moving files

mv
- Original authors: Ken Thompson, Dennis Ritchie (AT&T Bell Laboratories)
- Developers: Various open-source and commercial developers
- Initial release: November 3, 1971; 54 years ago
- Operating system: Unix, Unix-like, Inferno, IBM i
- Platform: Cross-platform
- Type: Command
- License: coreutils: GPLv3

mv is a shell command for renaming and moving files and directories. If both items are on the same file system, the command renames; otherwise items are copied to the destination and the old items are removed (more specifically unlinked). To move between two directories, the user must have write permission for both because the command modifies the content of both. For a rename, an item's timestamp is not modified.

On Unix implementations derived from AT&T Unix, cp, ln and mv are implemented as a single program with hard-linked binaries.

== History ==
Multics provided a file move/rename command named move. A version with the contracted name mv appeared in Version 1 Unix and became part of the X/Open Portability Guide issue 2 of 1987. The version in GNU Core Utilities was written by Mike Parker, David MacKenzie, and Jim Meyering. The command is available in Windows via UnxUtils. The command was ported to IBM i.

== Options ==
Most implementations support:

- -i interactive; the command prompts the user to confirm moving each file that would overwrite an existing file; overrides a preceding -f option
- -f force overwriting existing files; overrides a preceding -i option

These options are a part of X/Open Portability Guidelines, later the basis of POSIX and SUS. A POSIX-compliant implementation must support these.

== Name clashing ==
When a file is moved to a path that specifies an existing file, the existing file is clobbered by default. If the existing file is not writable but is in a directory that is writable, the command prompts the user to confirm overwrite (if run from a terminal), unless the -f option is included.

Accidental overwriting can be prevented using the GNU implementation -n (long format: --no-clobber) option. Alternatively, -u (--update) only overwrites destination files that are older than source files, -i (--interactive) asks for confirmation upon each name conflict, and -b (--backup) renames target files to prevent overwrite.

Ambiguity arises when a file is moved to a path that specifies an existing directory. By default, mv handles this by moving the file inside the directory. The GNU implementation has a -T switch for that tries to overwrite the directory instead. An inverse -t makes the move-to-directory operation explicit.

== Moving versus copying and removing ==
Moving files within the same file system is generally implemented more efficiently than copying the file and then removing the original. On platforms that do not support the rename() system call, a new hard link is added to the new directory and the original one is deleted. The data of the file is not accessed. A POSIX-conformant system implements rename().

Such an operation is significantly simpler and faster than a copy-and-move operation. The file's inode number (i-number) does not change. No permission is required to read the file since only cataloguing information is changed. Since the source and target directories are being modified, entries are being created within the target directory and erased from within the source directory, write permission in both directories is required. Moving files from one file system to another may fail entirely or may be automatically performed as an atomic copy-and-delete action; the actual details are dependent upon the implementation.

Moving a directory from one parent to a different parent directory requires write permission in the directory being moved, in addition to permissions to modify the old and new parents. This is because the i-number for the directory entry ".." (an alias for the parent of a directory) changes as a result of the rename.

== Examples ==
The following renames file or directory foo to bar. This assumes that bar is not an existing directory beforehand.

$ mv foo bar

The following moves the file or directory foo into the existing subdirectory subdir so that the result is at path subdir/foo.

$ mv foo subdir

The following moves the file or directory foo into directory subdir with name bar so that the resulting is path subdir/bar. This assumes that subdir/bar is not an existing directory beforehand.

$ mv foo subdir/bar

The following moves two files/directories, foo and bar, to existing directory subdir.

$ mv foo bar subdir

Copy be.03 to the bes directory of the mounted volume bkup, then be.03 is removed. In this example, /mnt refers to the directory (the "mount point") over which a file system is mounted.

$ mv be.03 /mnt/bkup/bes

Same as above, except each file moved out of be.03 is removed individually instead of all being removed at once after the entire copying is finished.

$ mv be.03/* /mnt/bkup/bes

The following takes longer than expected if /var is on a different file system, as it frequently is, since files will be copied and removed. The shell expands ~ to the user's home directory and treats * as a wildcard character.

$ mv /var/log/*z ~/logs

== See also ==
- cp (Unix) – Shell command that copies file
- List of POSIX commands
- ln (Unix) – Shell command for creating a link file
- move (command) – Shell command for moving files
- ren (command) – Shell command for renaming a file or directory
- rm (Unix) – Shell command for deleting files
