= Apparat, Inc. =

Defunct American computer company

- Type: Private
- Industry: Computer hardware; Computer software
- Founded: 1978; 48 years ago in Denver, Colorado
- Founders: Jim Lauletta; Clifford Ide
- Defunct: 1988; 38 years ago
- Fate: Ceased operations
- Products: NewDos/80

Apparat, Inc., was an American software developer, peripheral manufacturer, mail order company, and retailer active from 1978 to 1988 and primarily based in Denver, Colorado. They are best known for NewDos/80, an alternative operating system to TRSDOS for Tandy Corporation's TRS-80 line of home computers, sold through their Radio Shack stores. Apparat themselves sold modified TRS-80s through their mail order catalog. The company pivoted to selling peripherals for the IBM Personal Computer in 1982, continuing in this market until Apparat went defunct in 1988.

== History ==
=== Foundation (1978–1980) ===
1981 catalog of products by Apparat, Inc.

Apparat was founded in 1978 by Jim Lauletta and Clifford Ide, two computer programmers from Denver, Colorado. The company began as a mail-order reseller of peripherals and disk drives for Tandy Corporation's TRS-80, products which were usually only sold through Tandy's own Radio Shack stores and catalogs. Lauletta was also a founding member of the Denver 6502 Group, a very early computer club dedicated to systems running MOS Technology's 6502 processor (unlike the TRS-80, which was based on Zilog's Z80). Apparat eventually became a value-added reseller of entire TRS-80 systems, outfitting them with enhanced Tandon floppy disk drives and more RAM.

In the year of their founding, Apparat began work on an alternative disk operating system for the TRS-80. After two years of semi-public beta testing, the operating system was formally released as NewDos/80 in 1980, the name christened by Dick Miller, Apparat's East Coast distributor.

=== NewDos/80 (1980) ===
Authored by Ide, NewDos/80 was the first third-party operating system for the TRS-80, giving users an alternative to the TRS-80's native TRSDOS. Initial versions of NewDos/80 were actually patches to TRSDOS requiring the user already own a legal copy of the latter. Later versions were programmed from the ground up. NewDos/80 was immensely popular among users of the TRS-80 almost immediately after its publication. InfoWorld published a rave review of the operating system in 1980, writing: "NEWDOS/80 belongs in every TRS-80 disk owner's software library. It is a superior operating system that increases the value of the microcomputer, whether you use it for recreation, business, or miscellaneous household purposes."

Tandy were displeased with the popularity of NewDos/80, perceiving the software as infringing their copyrights to TRSDOS, and lodged cease and desist letters at Apparat's front desk. However, a formal lawsuit was delayed by a dispute over legal ownership of TRSDOS between Tandy Corporation and Randy Cook, the original author of TRSDOS. According to Cook, Apparat themselves countered with a lawsuit against Tandy, giving Tandy an ultimatum by having them pay for Apparat to fix an exhaustive list of bugs within TRSDOS. Cook found Apparat's settlement terms tantamount to blackmail, but according to him, Tandy gave this strong consideration in order to avoid the battle for ownership of TRSDOS between the company and Cook. The lawsuit dissolved after Apparat rewrote NewDos/80 from scratch in 1981.

=== Beyond NewDos, IBM PC products, and dissolution (1980–1988) ===
Starting in late 1980, Apparat briefly marketed Apex, an operating system developed by Peter Boyle. Apex was targeted at the Apple II and other 6502-based personal computers. It was based on the command format and syntax of Digital Equipment Corporation (DEC) operating systems such as Top-10, and was similar to CP/M, which was also based on DEC operating systems. Apex was written in XPL0, one of the first block structured programming languages for microcomputers. XPL0 was also written by Peter Boyle.

Employment at Apparat reached 35 in 1983, the company hiring 10 more people the following year. In late 1982, Apparat pivoted to vending for the IBM Personal Computer and compatibles. The company resold entire IBM PCs and peripherals for the system through their mail-order catalog and introducing their own bespoke hard disk drive product for the PC in 1983. Apparat's Hard Disk Subsystem received high marks in the technology press of the time and was featured on the front cover of PC Magazine in 1984. Other IBM PC peripherals that Apparat sold included the Clock/Calendar Board, a real-time clock expansion card; the Combo Card, a multifunction board adding real-time clock and additional serial and parallel ports; CGA monitors, RAM expansion cards, and floppy disk drives.

As well as developing hardware and software and running their mail-order catalog, Apparat was also active in retailing, opening up a couple of locations in the Denver area dedicated to selling products listed in the company's catalog. In 1984, the company opened up a branch office and retail store in Arlington Heights, Illinois, near Chicago. In 1985, the company began selling their own bespoke IBM PC–compatible computer systems exclusively through their retail locations.

Apparat ceased operations in 1988.
