= Directory (OpenVMS command) =

DIRECTORY
- Other names: DIR
- Developers: Digital Equipment Corporation, Compaq, Hewlett-Packard, VMS Software Inc
- Operating system: OpenVMS
- Platform: VAX, Alpha, Itanium, x86-64
- Type: Command

In computer software, specifically the DCL command-line interface of the OpenVMS operating system, the DIRECTORY command (often abbreviated as DIR) is used to list the files inside a directory. It is analogous to the MS-DOS dir and Unix ls commands.

== Sample output ==
$ dir 

Directory DISK$USER:[EBROCKLESBY.DICT.DICTD-1_8_0]

ANNOUNCE.;1         CHANGELOG.;1        CLIENTPARSE.Y;1     CLIENTSCAN.L;1     
CODES.H;1           CONFIG.GUESS;1      CONFIG.H_IN;1       CONFIG.SUB;1       
CONFIGURE.;1        CONFIGURE.IN;1      COPYING.;1          DAEMON.C;1         
DATA.C;1            DECL.H;1            DICT.1;1            DICT.C;1           
DICT.H;1            DICTD.8;1           DICTD.C;1           DICTD.CONF;1       
DICTD.H;1           DICTFMT.1;1         DICTFMT.C;1         
DICTFMT_INDEX2SUFFIX.;1                 DICTFMT_PLUGIN.;1   DICTP.H;1          
DICTZIP.1;1         DICTZIP.C;1         DICTZIP.H;1         DOC.DIR;1          
EXAMPLE.CONF;1      EXAMPLE.DICTRC;1    EXAMPLE.SITE;1      EXAMPLE2.CONF;1    
EXAMPLE3.CONF;1     INDEX.C;1           INITSCRIPT.;1       INSTALL-SH.;1      
INSTALL.;1          LIBMAA.DIR;1        MAKEFILE.;2         MAKEFILE.CONF;1    
MAKEFILE.IN;2       MD5.C;1             MD5.H;1             NET.C;1            
NET.H;1             PLUGIN.H;1          README.;1           REGEX.DIR;1        
SERVPARSE.Y;1       SERVSCAN.L;1        TODO.;1             UTF8_UCS4.C;1      
UTF8_UCS4.H;1       ZLIB.DIR;1          

Total of 56 files.

== See also ==
- Ls
- Dir (command)
