= Microware =

American software company

Microware Systems Corporation
- Industry: Computer software
- Founded: 1977; 49 years ago
- Defunct: 2001
- Fate: Acquired by Radisys
- Headquarters: Clive, Iowa, United States
- Products: OS-9, OS-9000
- Website: www.microware.com

Microware Systems Corporation was an American software company based in Clive, Iowa, that produced the OS-9 real-time operating system.

Microware Systems Corporation existed as a separate entity from 1977 until September 2001, when it was bought by RadiSys Corp., and became a division of that company. The rights to Microware OS-9 and related software were purchased by a group of distributors on 1 March 2013. The new owner was Microware LP. Microware initially produced a version of BASIC and a real-time kernel for the Motorola 6800 processor, and was asked by Motorola to develop what turned into BASIC09 for the then-new Motorola 6809 processor. Having written BASIC09, they decided it needed an operating system underlying it, and they created the first version of OS-9.

OS-9 was ported to the 68000 family of processors and, after being rewritten mostly in C, to the Intel 80x86, PowerPC, ARM, MIPS, and some of the Hitachi SuperH (SH) series processors. Initially, in the days of the SS-50 bus and SS-50C bus systems such as SWTPC, Gimix, and Smoke Signal Broadcasting, OS-9 was used more as a general purpose microcomputer operating system and had a large, active hobbyist-user population. OS-9 was also popular with industrial and embedded-system users. This was especially true when OS-9 was available for popular 6809-based computers such as the FM-7, FM-77, and the Tandy TRS-80 Color Computer and its near-clone, the Dragon. Over time, Microware concentrated on industrial customers and neglected the hobbyist base that was porting a great many Unix packages and utilities to OS-9.

== Microware products ==
- RT68 – the original product for the 6800
- OS-9 and OS-9000 – real-time operating systems for a wide range of embedded CPU architectures.
- CD-RTOS – the operating system used in the Philips CD-i players, which was a special version of OS-9/68K v2.4.
- DAVID – the Digital Audio Video Interactive Decoder platform for digital TV.
- Ariel – a micro OS based on an OS Microware acquired (MTOS-UX by IPI).
- Color Computer 3 BASIC ROM extensions to support 80-column text and new graphics modes not in the CoCo 1 and 2's Extended Color BASIC ROM
