= Renaming =

Renaming may refer to:

== Place names ==
- Geographical renaming
- Lists of renamed places

== Computing ==
- Batch renaming
- Register renaming
- Rename (computing)
- Rename (relational algebra)

== Internet culture ==
- Great Renaming

== See also ==
- Rename (disambiguation)
