= Recover (command) =

recover
- Original author: Chris Peters
- Developers: Microsoft, IBM, Digital Research, Novell, Imre Leber
- Release: 1983, 42–43 years ago
- Written in: MS-DOS: x86 assembly language
- Operating system: MS-DOS, PC DOS, SISNE plus, OS/2, eComStation, ArcaOS, Windows, DR DOS, FreeDOS
- Platform: Cross-platform
- Type: Command
- License: MS-DOS: MIT; FreeDOS: GPL
- Website: docs.microsoft.com/en-us/windows-server/administration/windows-commands/recover
- Repository: github.com/microsoft/MS-DOS/blob/main/v2.0/source/RECOVER.ASM

In computing, recover is a primitive file system error recovery utility included in MS-DOS / IBM PC DOS versions prior to DOS 6.0 and a number of other operating systems.

== Overview ==
Typing recover at the DOS command-line invoked the program file RECOVER.COM or RECOVER.EXE (depending on the DOS version). recover proceeded under the assumption that all directory information included on a disk or disk partition was hopelessly corrupted, but that the FAT and non-directory areas might still contain useful information (though there might be additional bad disk sectors not recorded in the FAT).

The program removed all subdirectories and all entries in the root directory, and then created new files with names such as "FILE0001.REC" in the root directory, corresponding to the valid allocation chains that were found in the FAT area (excluding disk clusters that were tested and found to have hardware errors). A formerly bootable disk would no longer be bootable after recover had executed. The range of circumstances in which recover was genuinely useful was quite limited, and well-meaning DOS users sometimes created havoc by running recover under the misconception that it was a file undelete utility.

In DOS version 5, another mode of operation was added: specifying a single filename on the command line would cause the program to test all the disk sectors used to store the file, and shorten the file by omitting sectors which tested bad.

DR DOS 6.0 includes an implementation of the recover command. The command is also available on SISNE plus and IBM OS/2. The FreeDOS version was developed by Imre Leber and is licensed under the GPL.

== See also ==
- Chkdsk
- Scandisk
- Norton Utilities
- List of DOS commands
