= TenAsys =

American software company

TenAsys Corporation
- Type: Private
- Industry: Embedded and Real-time Software
- Founded: 2000; 26 years ago
- Headquarters: Hillsboro, Oregon, US; 45°31′52″N 122°52′53″W
- Products: iRMX, INtime, and eVM
- Website: www.tenasys.com

TenAsys (rhymes with tenacious) is a privately owned company providing real-time software and services based on the x86 Intel Architecture and Microsoft Windows operating system.

== History ==
The company was founded in 2000 as a spin-off of RadiSys Corporation to exploit the RTOS technology based on the iRMX and INtime for Windows products originally developed by Intel Corporation. RadiSys acquired the iRMX and INtime RTOS technology when they purchased Intel's Multibus division in 1996.

RadiSys released version 1.0 of the INtime RTOS in June, 1997. The product was selected as one of two finalists in the EDN 1997 "Innovation of the Year" embedded development category.

Effective 2000 iRMX III is supported, maintained, and licensed worldwide by TenAsys Corporation, under an exclusive licensing arrangement with Intel.

== Products ==
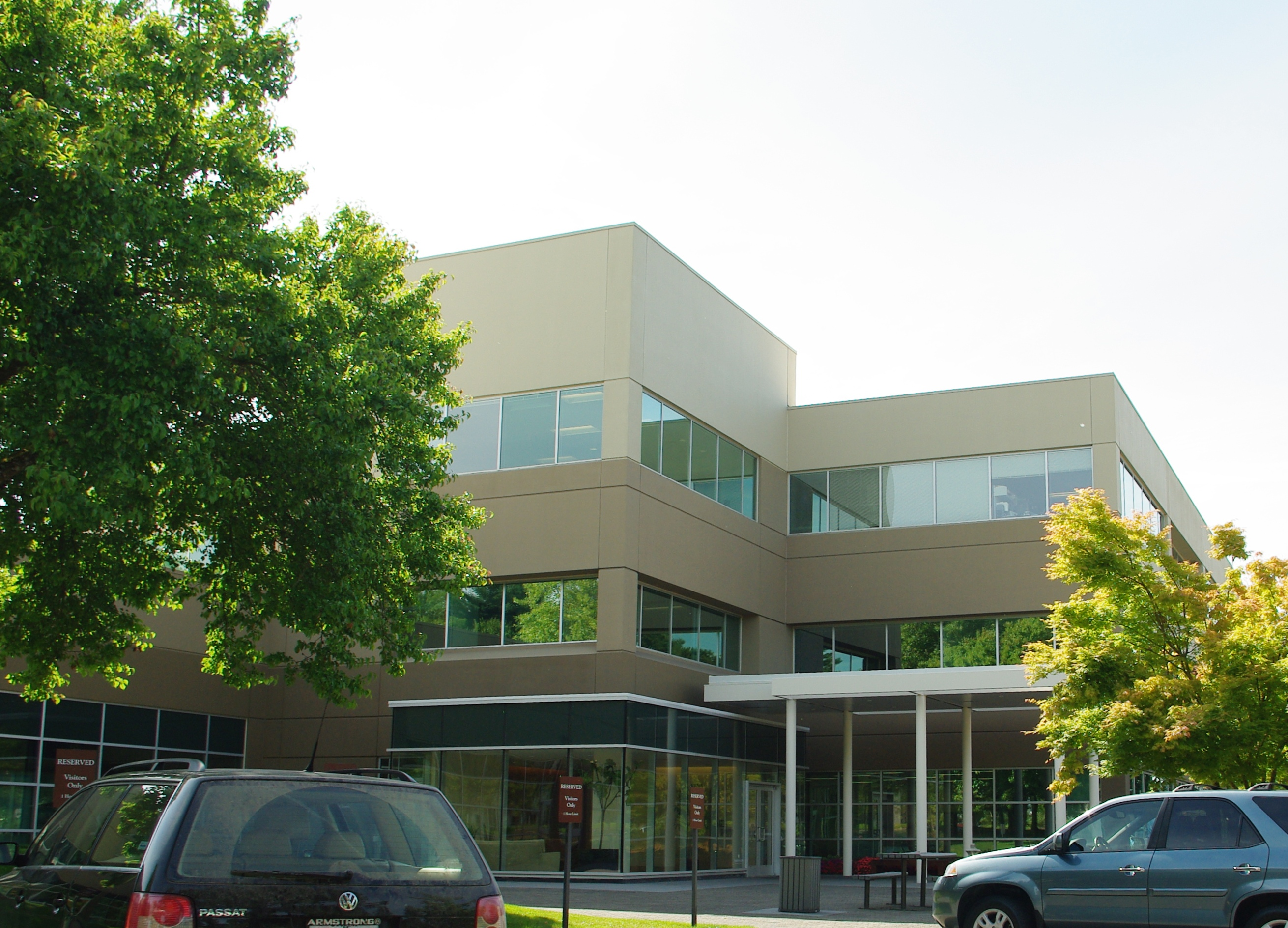
Building that houses the company

TenAsys develops real-time operating system (RTOS) products designed to merge two separate computing platforms into one. Specifically, their products provide a means by which an RTOS can run in parallel with Windows on a standard PC platform. Their products are specific to the x86 Intel architecture.

=== iRMX III ===
iRMX is a real-time operating system designed specifically for use with the Intel 8080 and Intel 8086 family of processors. It is an acronym for Real-time Multitasking eXecutive. Intel developed iRMX in the late 1970s and originally released it in 1980 to support and create demand for their processors and Multibus system platforms.

=== iRMX for Windows ===
iRMX for Windows provides legacy support for existing applications based on the iRMX III real-time operating system and the iRMX for Windows RTOS produced by Intel beginning in 1992.

The iRMX for Windows RTOS loads and runs on a standard Windows system. Upon initialization, it sets up a separate execution environment, takes over the CPU, and encapsulates Windows as the lowest priority iRMX task. The iRMX operating system scheduler then determines which tasks will run; whenever a real-time task is ready to run, it preempts Windows, handles all real-time activities, and then resumes Windows (the lowest priority iRMX task) after all real-time activities have completed.

=== INtime RTOS for Windows ===
Like iRMX for Windows, the INtime RTOS also installs on a standard Windows system. Once installed, the INtime RTOS schedules all real-time processes to run first, at a higher priority than Windows. The INtime RTOS runs as a separate, independent kernel outside of the Windows kernel, without modifying the Windows kernel, drivers, or applications.

Real-time processes run on the INtime kernel, and non-real-time processes run on Windows. Windows application threads communicate with their real time counterparts on the INtime kernel through a special API that facilitates coordination and data sharing.

=== eVM Virtualization Platform for Windows ===
The eVM virtualization platform provides a virtual machine that hosts real-time and embedded operating systems running alongside Microsoft Windows. The eVM platform requires Intel virtualization technology (or Intel VT) in order to operate. The guest OS that runs within the VMM runs in parallel with Windows, on an industry-standard, PC-compatible, multi-core platform.

Legacy I/O can be emulated using Intel VT. Virtual communication channels, such as a virtual Ethernet or a virtual serial link, provide a means for embedded applications running on the VMM to coordinate with Windows applications.

Direct hardware (access to I/O) and deterministic timing (interrupt latency) needs are addressed by giving the guest OS direct access to time-critical hardware. I/O is assigned exclusively to each guest OS so existing native device drivers have direct access to real hardware.

=== Development Environment ===
TenAsys RTOS tools are integrated into the Microsoft Visual Studio IDE.
