= Itautec =

Brazilian electronics company

Itautec S.A - Grupo Itautec

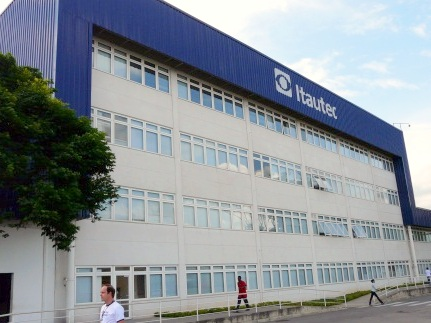
- Itautec factory in Jundiaí (2010)
- Type: Sociedade Anônima
- Industry: Computer System; Software; IT Services
- Founded: 1979; 47 years ago
- Headquarters: São Paulo, Brazil
- Key people: Ricardo Egydio Setubal, (Chairman); Mario Anseloni Neto, (CEO)
- Products: Computer Monitors; Personal Computer; Laptops
- Revenue: ▼ R$ 439 million (2013)
- Net income: ▼ R$ 278 million (2013)
- Number of employees: 5,709
- Parent: Itaúsa
- Website: www.itautec.com.br

Itautec is a Brazilian electronics company founded in 1979. Currently, its a division of the Itaúsa group, a Brazilian business group.

Itautec is an ATM, kiosk, and computer manufacturer in the Brazilian and South American markets. The company also has a key role in project deployment and IT services around the globe.

It mainly focuses on making consumer electronics, banking, and retail automation. The company has a large base of ATMs globally. Itautec is headquartered in São Paulo. The company operates a manufacturing plant in the city of Jundiaí (SP), and Itautec has 5,709 direct employees – 5,285 in Brazil and 424 abroad.

== History ==
Founded in 1979, Itautec began its activities on Avenida do Estado, in Sāo Paulo, as a technology company originating from a department of Banco Itau. The company specialized in the development of products and solutions, eventually possessing the tenth largest installed base of self-service machines (ATMs), in the world and the second largest in Latin America, according to Retail Banking Research, and the largest proprietary network of IT technical assistance in Brazil.

In 1980, Itautec established its first online presence as GRI Gerenciador de Redes Itautec, known as the "Itautec Network Services Provider," along with Banktec mainframes. The following year, in 1981, the central agency of Itaú was founded, featuring an automation system developed by Itautec. By 1982, the Bank of Brazil had implemented GRI and Banktec systems.

Itautec introduced the PC/XT microcomputer in 1985, entering the personal computing market. In 1986, Itautec installed its first compact Automated teller machine(ATM). In 1989, Itautec introduced GRIP (Gerenciamento de Redes Itautec para PC), a network management system designed for PCs. It also acquired control of Philco in Brazil from Ford, but were sold the Philco brand and any unit related to Gradiente.

In 1990, Itautec released its first Notebook computer, the IS 386 Note. In 1994, the company launched a second-generation ATM in Brazil, followed by the introduction of the first version of Banktec Multicanal in Banco Itaú Argentina in 1995.

By 2001, Itautec began exporting ATMs to the United States and Europe. In 2002, the company acquired technology from NMD for DelaRue and installed the first WEB system in Banco Itaú Buen Ayre.

In 2009, Itautec ranked 24th in the Fintech ranking, which lists the world's largest IT providers. In 2011, Itautec introduced the world's first touchless 3D ATM.

== See also ==
- SISNE plus

== Sources ==
- American Banker article: "ATM's Hologram Interface Deters Theft"
- Credit Union Journal article: "First Touchscreen 3D ATM Launched for CUMarket"
