= ISIS (operating system) =

- Developer: Intel
- Written in: Assembler, PL/M
- Working state: Historic
- Source model: Closed source
- Initial release: 1975
- Marketing target: exclusively for Intel Microprocessor Development System
- Supported platforms: Intel 8080, Intel 8085
- Default user interface: Command line interface
- License: Proprietary
- Succeeded by: ISIS II
- Official website: isis-mds.com (Archive)

Support status
- Obsolete

ISIS, short for Intel System Implementation Supervisor, was an operating system for early Intel microprocessors like the 8080. It was originally developed by Ken Burgett and Jim Stein under the management of Steve Hanna and Terry Opdendyk for the Intel Microprocessor Development System with two 8" floppy drives, starting in 1975, and later adopted as ISIS-II as the operating system for the PL/M compiler, assembler, link editor, and In-Circuit Emulator (developed by Steve Morse). The ISIS operating system was developed on an early prototype of the MDS 800 computer, the same type of hardware that Gary Kildall used to develop CP/M.

== Overview ==
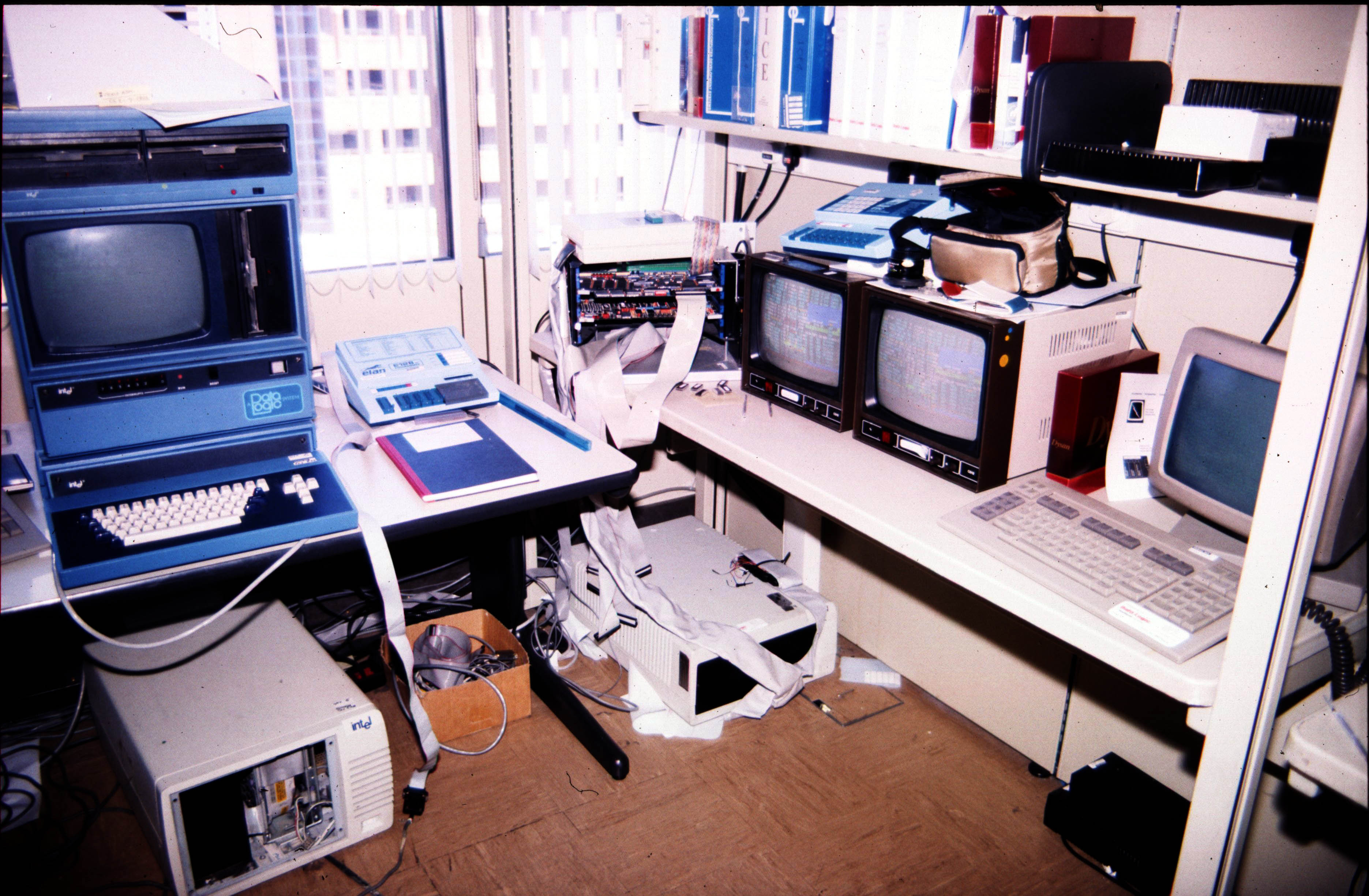
An Intel MDS system in the UK in April 1987

Communication with the user is terminal-like. Its user interface is somewhat CP/M-like, even from the program interface point of view. For file opening, the program sends the name of file and gets back a handle. Each device has a name, which is entered between a pair of colons (:F0: and :F1: are floppies, :LP: is printer, etc.). Each diskette has one directory and no subdirectories. ISIS-II has been distributed as part of the Intel Microprocessor Development System and includes standard operating system commands (COPY, DELETE, DIR, RENAME, FORMAT) and debugging software (assembler, linker and debugger for external debugging in the developed device). There are two editors, one of which, AEDIT, contains editing macros support. File editing is provided directly on diskette (a .BAK file is always created). The other editor is CREDIT.

ISIS-II needed at least 32 kilobytes of RAM, the 8080/8085 CPU maximum address space was 64 kilobytes. In the MDS-800 and Series-II, the Monitor occupied F800h to FFFFh. Floppy disk format was 8-inch single-sided, 250 KB single-sided, single-density FM, or 500 KB single-sided, double-density MMFM. ISIS-PDS was also software and media incompatible and unique, it came on 720 KB double-sided double-density (DSDD) 5¼-inch floppies with the Intel personal development system (iPDS-100).

The ISIS-IV operating system was another incompatible (even with other Intel development systems) that ran on the iMDX-430 Series-IV Network Development System-II.

Intel ASM80, PLM-80, BASIC-80, COBOL-80, FORTRAN-80 were all available for ISIS-II. ASM86, ASM48, ASM51 were available as well.

=== Commands ===
The following list of commands are supported by the ISIS-II console.

- IDISK
- FORMAT
- OBJHEX
- EDIT
- LIB
- LINK
- LOCATE

== See also ==
- CONV86
- CP/M
- Intel HEX
- Intel Object Module Format (OMF)
- RMX (operating system) or iRMX
