= Dsw (command) =

Obsolete shell command for deleting files with unutterable names

dsw
- Original authors: Dennis Ritchie, Ken Thompson
- Developer: AT&T Bell Laboratories
- Initial release: November 3, 1971; 54 years ago
- Operating system: Unix
- Type: Command

dsw (delete from switches) is an obsolete Unix shell command which enables deletion of files with non-typeable characters. The command debuted in Unix Version 1 and was replaced by adding the -i option to rm in Version 7. Doug McIlroy wrote that dsw "was a desperation tool designed to clean up files with unutterable names".

== See also ==
- List of POSIX commands
