= TIME (command) =

Command used to display and set time

time
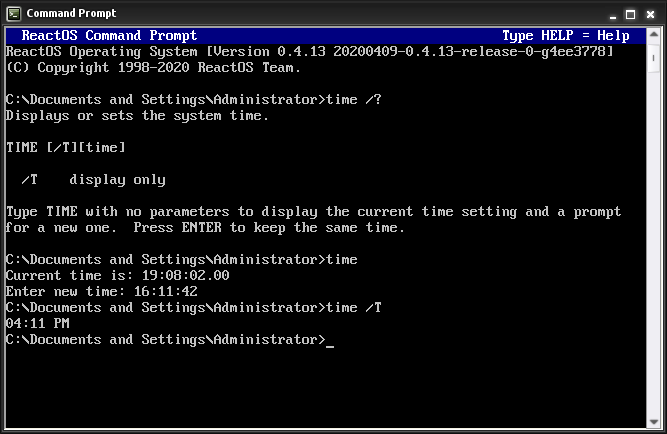
- The ReactOS time command
- Operating system: RT-11, VERSAdos, iRMX 86, MS-DOS, PC DOS, MSX-DOS, DR-DOS, PC-MOS, SpartaDOS X, OS/2, eComStation, ArcaOS, Windows, ROM-DOS, SISNE plus, PTS-DOS, FreeDOS, ReactOS, SymbOS, DexOS
- Platform: Cross-platform
- Type: Command
- License: PC-MOS: GPL-3.0-only; ReactOS: GPL-2.0-only

In computing, TIME is a command in DEC RT-11, DOS, IBM OS/2, Microsoft Windows and a number of other operating systems that is used to display and set the current system time. It is included in command-line interpreters (shells) such as COMMAND.COM, cmd.exe, 4DOS, 4OS2 and 4NT.

== Implementations ==
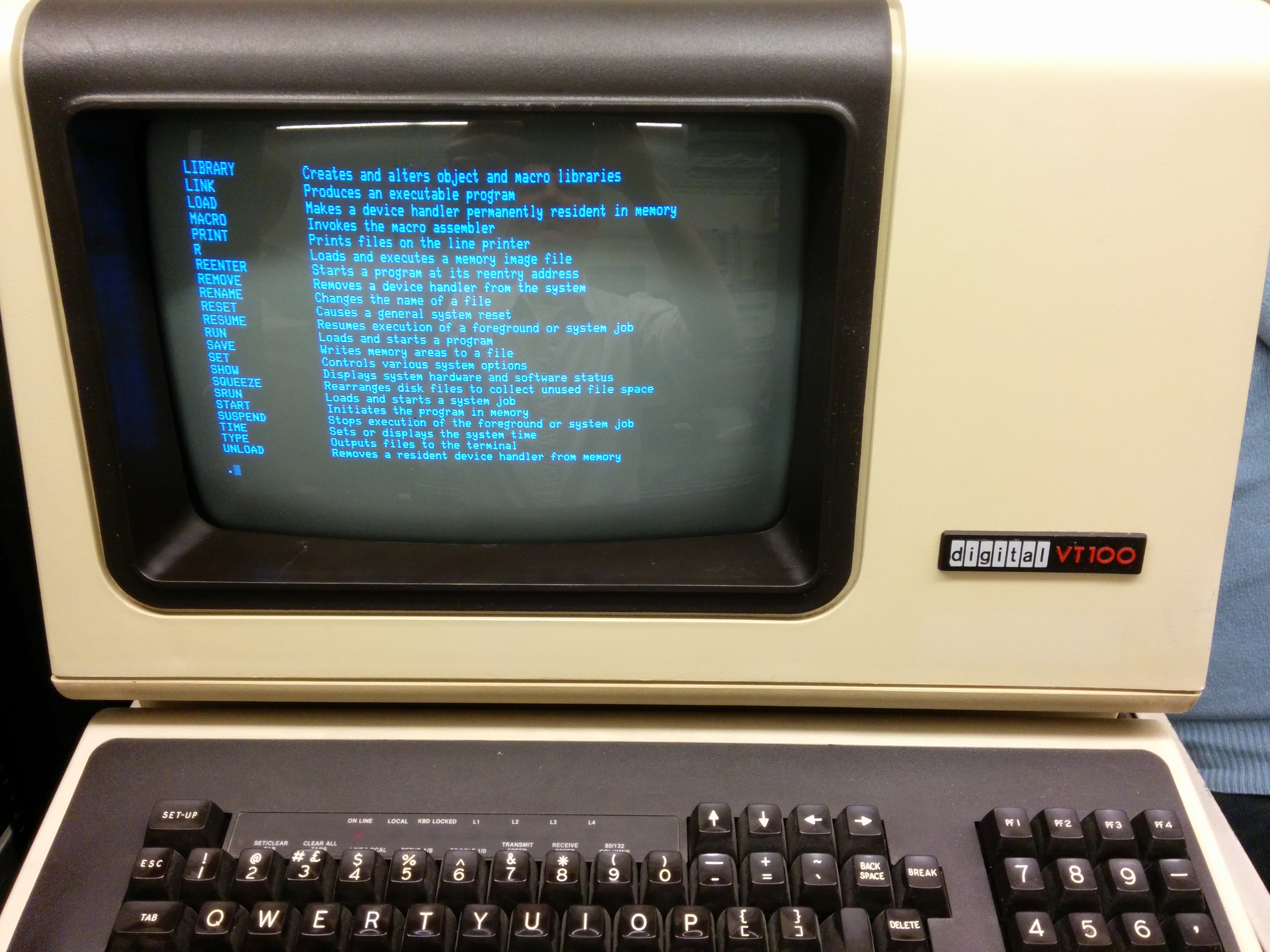
Description of the TIME command of RT-11SJ displayed on a VT100.

The command is also available in the Motorola VERSAdos, Intel iRMX 86, PC-MOS, SpartaDOS X, ReactOS, SymbOS, and DexOS operating systems as well as in the EFI shell. On MS-DOS, the command is available in versions 1 and later.

In Unix, the date command displays and sets both the time and date, in a similar manner.

== Syntax ==
The syntax differs depending on the specific platform and implementation:

=== DOS ===
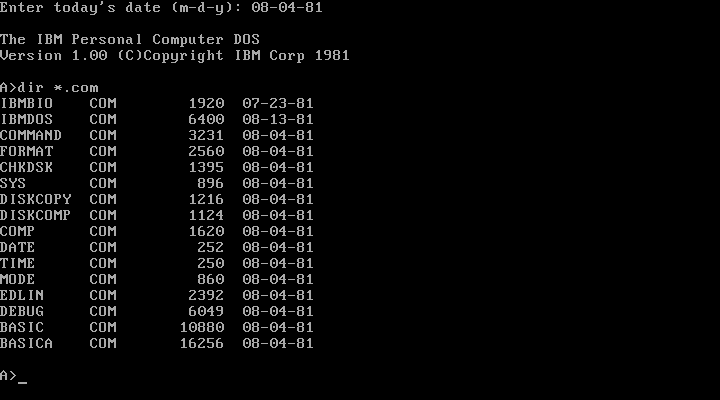
TIME.COM (among other commands) in IBM PC DOS 1.0.

TIME [time]

=== OS/2 (CMD.EXE) ===
TIME [hh-mm-ss] [/N]

Note: /N means no prompt for TIME.

=== Windows (CMD.EXE) ===
 TIME [/T | time]

When this command is called from the command line or a batch script, it will display the time and wait for the user to type a new time and press RETURN. Pressing RETURN without entering a new time will keep the current system time. The parameter '/T' will bypass asking the user to reset the time. The '/T' parameter is supported in Windows Vista and later and only if Command Extensions are enabled.

=== 4DOS, 4OS2 and 4NT ===
TIME [/T] [hh[:mm[:ss]]] [AM | PM]

/T:  (display only)
hh:  The hour (0–23).
mm:  The minute (0–59).
ss:  The second (0–59), set to 0 if omitted.

== Examples ==
=== OS/2 (CMD.EXE) ===
- Display the current system time:

[C:\]TIME
Current time is:  3:25 PM
Enter the new time:

=== Windows (CMD.EXE) ===
- To set the computer clock to 3:42 P.M., either of the following commands can be used:

C:\>TIME 15:42
C:\>TIME 3:42P

=== 4DOS, 4OS2 and 4NT ===
- Display the current system time:

C:\SYS\SHELL\4DOS>TIME /T
19:30:42

== Related commands ==
=== w32tm ===
w32tm is a command-line tool of Microsoft Windows used to diagnose problems occurring with time setting or to troubleshoot any problems that might occur during or after the configuration of the Windows Time service. It was introduced as a standard feature of Windows 2000.

The command can be used to convert an NTTE or NTP formatted date into a readable format.

As an example of using the command, the current time zone settings can be displayed using the /tz parameter:

>w32tm /tz

== See also ==
- DATE (command)
- date (Unix)
- List of DOS commands
- Date and time notation
