= IXP1200 =

The IXP1200 is a network processor fabricated by Intel Corporation. The processor was originally a Digital Equipment Corporation (DEC) project that had been in development since late 1996. When parts of DEC's Digital Semiconductor business was acquired by Intel in 1998 as part of an out-of-court settlement to end lawsuits each company had launched at each other for patent infringement, the processor was transferred to Intel. The DEC design team was retained and the design was completed by them under Intel. Samples of the processor were available for Intel partners since 1999, with general sample availability in late 1999. The processor was introduced in early 2000 at 166 and 200 MHz. A 232 MHz version was introduced later. The processor was later succeeded by the IXP2000, an XScale-based family developed entirely by Intel.

The processor was intended to replace the general-purpose embedded microprocessors and specialized application-specific integrated circuit (ASIC) combinations used in network routers. The IXP1200 was designed for mid-range and high-end routers. For high-end models, the processor could be combined with others to increase the capability and performance of the router.

The IXP1200 integrates a StrongARM SA-1100-derived core and six microengines, which were RISC microprocessors with an instruction set optimized for network packet workloads. The StrongARM core performed non-real-time functions while the microengines manipulated network packets. The processor also integrates static random access memory (SRAM) and synchronous dynamic random access memory (SDRAM) controllers, a PCI interface and an IX bus interface.

The IXP1200 contains 6.5 million transistors and measures 126 mm^{2}. It was fabricated in a 0.28 μm, complementary metal–oxide–semiconductor (CMOS) process with three levels of interconnect. It was packaged in a 432-ball enhanced ball grid array (EBGA). The IXP1200 was fabricated at DEC's former Hudson, Massachusetts plant.
