= MC68340 =

Microprocessor

- Board Name: MC68340
- Manufacturer: Freescale Semiconductor
- CPU Model: CPU32
- Power Consumption: Available in 3.3 and 5V
- Frequency: Available in 16 and 25 MHz
- Data Lines: 16
- Timer/Counters: Two 16-bit
- Address Lines: 32

The MC68340 is a high-performance 32-bit microprocessor with direct memory access (DMA).

== Features ==
- High Functional Integration on a Single Piece of Silicon
- Two-Channel Low-Latency DMA Controller for High-Speed Memory Transfers
- Two-Channel Universal Synchronous/Asynchronous Receiver/Transmitter (USART)
- Two Independent Counter/Timers
- System Integration Module Incorporates Many Functions Typically Relegated to External PALs, TTL, and ASIC
- 32 Address Lines, 16 Data Lines
- Power Consumption Control
- 0–16.78 MHz or 0–25.16 MHz Operation
- 144-Pin Ceramic Quad Flat Pack (CQFP) or 145-Pin Plastic Pin Grid Array (PGA)
- Available in 3.3 and 5V

== Family ==
The MC68340 is one of a series of components in Motorola's M68300 Family. Other members of the family include the MC68302, MC68330, MC68331, MC68332, and MC68F333.

== Sources ==
- Product Brief MC68340
- User’s Manual
- Freescale semiconductors
