= Ren (command) =

Shell command for renaming a file or directory

ren / rename
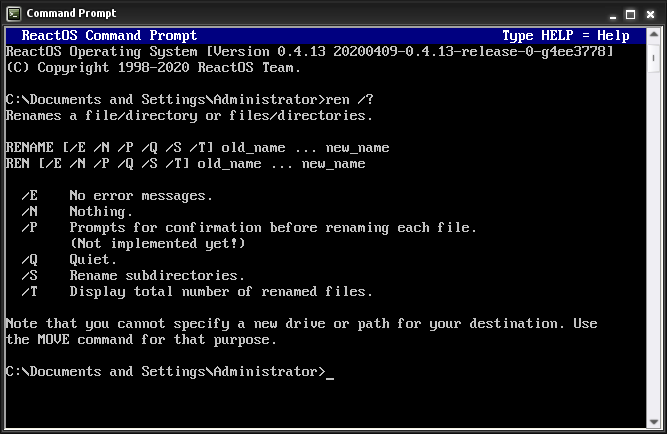
- The ReactOS ren command
- Developers: Various open-source and commercial developers
- Operating system: OpenVOS, RT-11, OS/8, RSX-11, ISIS-II, iRMX 86, TOPS-20, Z80-RIO, FLEX, CDOS, OS-9, FlexOS, PC-MOS, 4690 OS, MPE/iX, THEOS/OASIS, OpenVMS, CP/M, MP/M, TRIPOS, AmigaDOS, DOS, MSX-DOS, SISNE plus, OS/2, Windows, ReactOS, SymbOS, DexOS
- Platform: Cross-platform
- Type: Command

ren (or rename) is a shell command for renaming a file and in some implementations (such as AmigaDOS) a directory.

Some shells with ren also provide a move command that provides for moving between directories. On systems that do not support a move command (such as MS-DOS older than 6.00), the user could copy a file to a new destination and then delete the original file. In DOSBox, ren can move files.

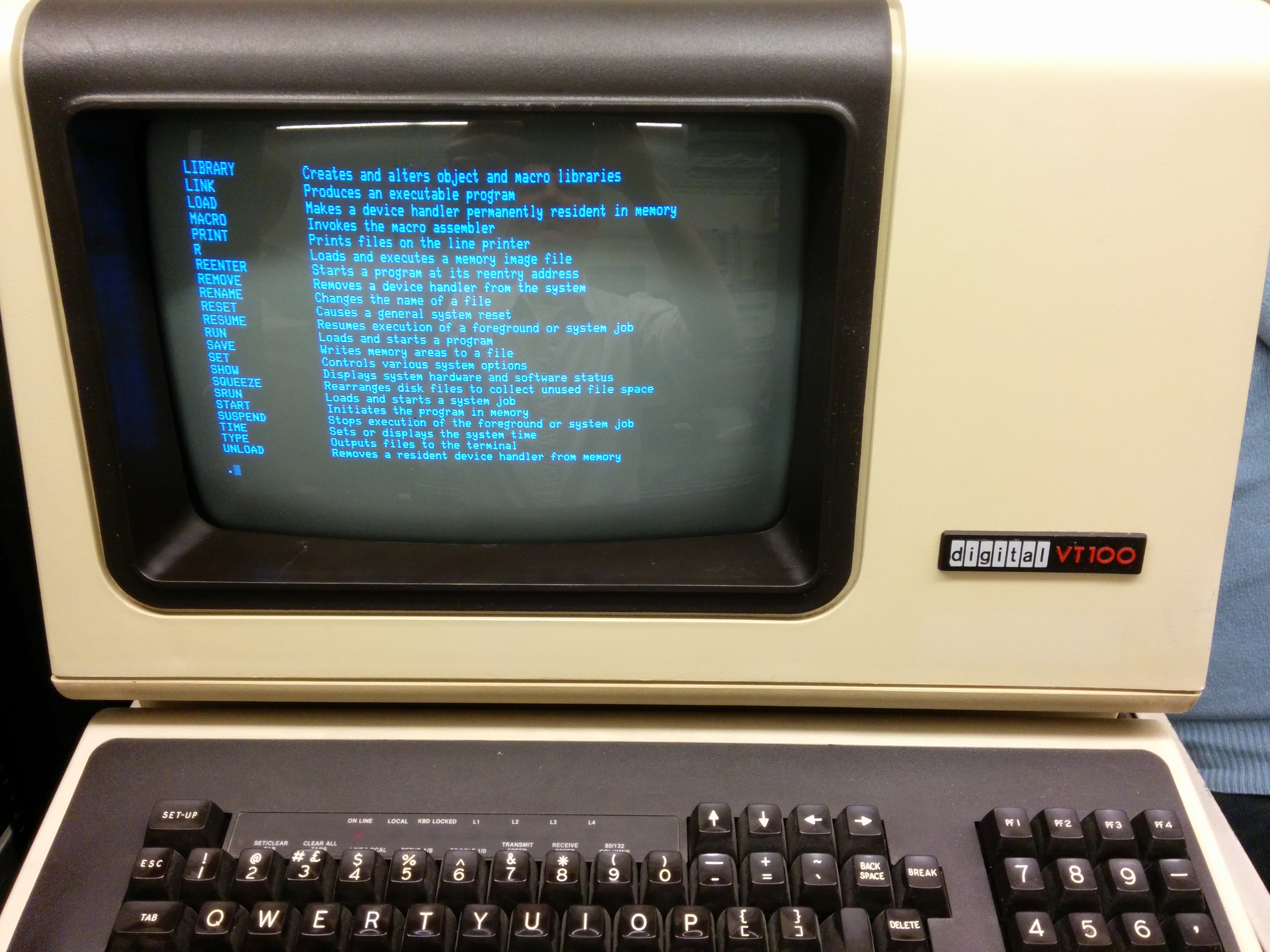
Description of the RENAME command of RT-11SJ displayed on a VT100.

The command is in various shells such as COMMAND.COM, Command Prompt, 4DOS, 4NT and PowerShell. In MS-DOS, the command is available in versions 1 and later. In PowerShell, ren is a predefined alias for the Rename-Item Cmdlet which serves the same essential purpose.

Similar commands are available in many operating systems. The command is available in the CP/M, MP/M, Cromemco DOS, TRIPOS, OS/2, ReactOS, SymbOS, and DexOS. Multics includes a rename command to rename a directory entry, which could be contracted to rn. A rename command which in some cases can be contracted to ren is provided in Stratus VOS, RT-11, OS/8, RSX-11, ISIS-II, iRMX 86, TOPS-20, Z80-RIO, FLEX, OS-9, FlexOS, 4690 OS, MPE/iX, THEOS/OASIS, and OpenVMS A rename command is supported by 86-DOS. DR DOS 6.0 includes ren and rename commands. PC-MOS includes an implementation of rename. It is also available in the MS-DOS emulator DOSBox.

== Example ==
The following renames file foo to bar.

> ren foo bar

The following renames a file specified by a fully qualified path. The first parameter may contain drive and path information, but the second parameter must be only a file name.

> rename "C:\Users\Public\Videos\Sample Videos\Wildlife.wmv" Wildlife2.wmv

The following removes abcd of a file name in Command Prompt based on the following rules:

- Same number of / as the number of characters to remove
- Requries double quotes for both arguments
- Won't remove . from a file name

> rename "abcd*.txt" "////*.txt"

== See also ==
- List of DOS commands
- List of PowerShell commands
