= Rmdir =

Directory management command on various operating systems

rmdir / rd
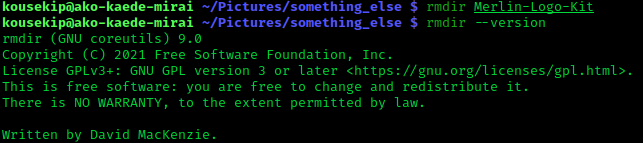
- Example of rmdir
- Original authors: Ken Thompson, Dennis Ritchie (AT&T Bell Laboratories)
- Developers: Various open-source and commercial developers
- Operating system: Unix, Unix-like, DOS, MSX-DOS, FlexOS, OS/2, Windows, ReactOS, KolibriOS
- Platform: Cross-platform
- Type: Command

In computing, rmdir (or rd) is a command which will remove an empty directory on various operating systems.

== Implementations ==
The command is available in Unix (e.g. macOS, Solaris, AIX, HP-UX), Unix-like (e.g. FreeBSD, Linux), DOS, Digital Research FlexOS, IBM OS/2, Microsoft Windows or ReactOS operating systems. On MS-DOS, the command is available in versions 2 and later. DR DOS 6.0 also includes an implementation of the rmdir command.

It is also available in the open source MS-DOS emulator DOSBox and in KolibriOS. The numerical computing environments MATLAB and GNU Octave include an rmdir function with similar functionality.

== Usage ==
=== Unix, Unix-like ===
Normal usage is straightforward:

$ rmdir name_of_directory

where name_of_directory corresponds with the name of the directory one wishes to delete. There are options to this command such as -p in Unix which removes parent directories if they are also empty.

For example:

$ rmdir -p foo/bar/baz

will first remove baz/, then bar/ and finally foo/ thus removing the entire directory tree specified in the command argument.

rmdir will not remove a directory if it is not empty in UNIX. The rm command will remove a directory and all its contents recursively. For example:

$ rm -r foo/bar/baz
$ rm -rf foo/bar/baz

=== DOS, OS/2, Windows, ReactOS ===
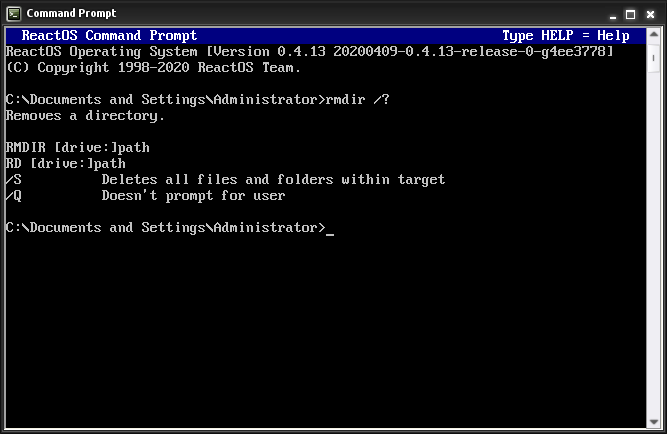
The ReactOS rmdir command

Normal usage is identical to Unix-like operating systems:

>rmdir name_of_directory

The equivalent command in MS-DOS and earlier (non-NT-based) versions of Microsoft Windows for deleting non-empty directories is deltree.

In later version of Windows:

>rd /s directory_name

Windows based on the NT kernel (XP, Vista, 7, 8, Server 2003/2008) are case insensitive, just like their earlier predecessors, unless two files of the same name and different case exist. Then case sensitivity applies when selecting which file to use, or if the case does not match either file, one may be chosen by Windows.

Having two files named the same with different case sensitivity is allowed either when Windows Services for Unix is installed or when the Windows Registry settings are set to allow it.

An example of the security risk is:

Using rd/rmdir and two directories with the same name and different case sensitivities exist, one of which contains valid data and/or programs, and the other contains incriminating materials and/or malware. If rd/rmdir gets executed without regard to case sensitivity and Windows chooses the legitimate folder to delete, the only folder left is the undesired one. Windows then uses this folder instead of the previously legitimate one to execute programs, and one may be led to believe it contains legitimate data.

== See also ==
- List of Unix commands
- List of DOS commands
