= Dir (command) =

Shell command for listing files and directories

dir
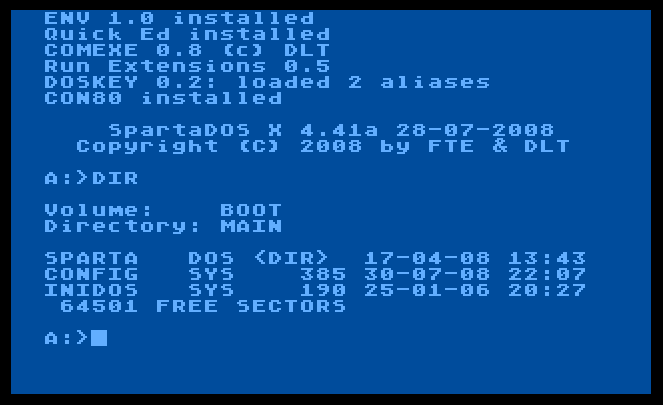
- The SpartaDOS X DIR command
- Developers: DEC, DR, Intel, Cromemco, MetaComCo, Microsoft, IBM, Datalight, ICD, Inc.
- Operating system: CP/M, MP/M, ISIS-II, iRMX 86, CDOS, TRIPOS, DOS, MSX-DOS, SISNE plus, 4690 OS, PC-MOS, OS/2, Windows, Singularity, ReactOS, AROS, VMS, RT-11, RSX-11, OS/8, AmigaDOS
- Platform: Cross-platform
- Type: Command
- License: CP/M, MP/M: BSD-like; MS-DOS: MIT; PC-MOS: GPL-3.0-only; ReactOS: GPL

dir, short for directory, is a shell command for listing file system contents: files and directories. Arguably, the command provides the same essential functionality as the ls command, but typically the two commands are described as notably separate concepts, possibly since ls is implemented from a codebase that shares more history than many dir implementations.

The command is often implemented as internal in the operating system shell instead of as a separate application as many other commands are.

== Variants ==
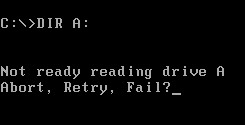
Screenshot showing the "Abort, Retry, Fail?" prompt on MS-DOS.

Although syntax, semantics and implementations vary, a dir command with essentially the same functionality is available in the operating systems: CP/M, MP/M, ISIS-II, iRMX 86, CDOS, TRIPOS, DOS, 4690 OS, OS/2, Windows, Singularity, ROM-DOS, ReactOS, GNU, AROS, VMS, RT-11, RSX-11, OS/8, 86-DOS, MS-DOS (in versions 1 and later), and DOSBox.

Some applications also provide a dir command with similar functionality. The typical File Transfer Protocol (FTP) command-line client provides a dir command for listing a remote directory. The numerical computing environments MATLAB and GNU Octave include a dir command.

Generally, Unix-like systems use the ls command for the needs that dir satisfies in other types of systems. Notably, the Unix-like GNU operating system, provides a dir command that is equivalent to ls -C -b; that is, by default files are listed in columns, sorted vertically, and special characters are represented by backslash escape sequences.

== Examples ==
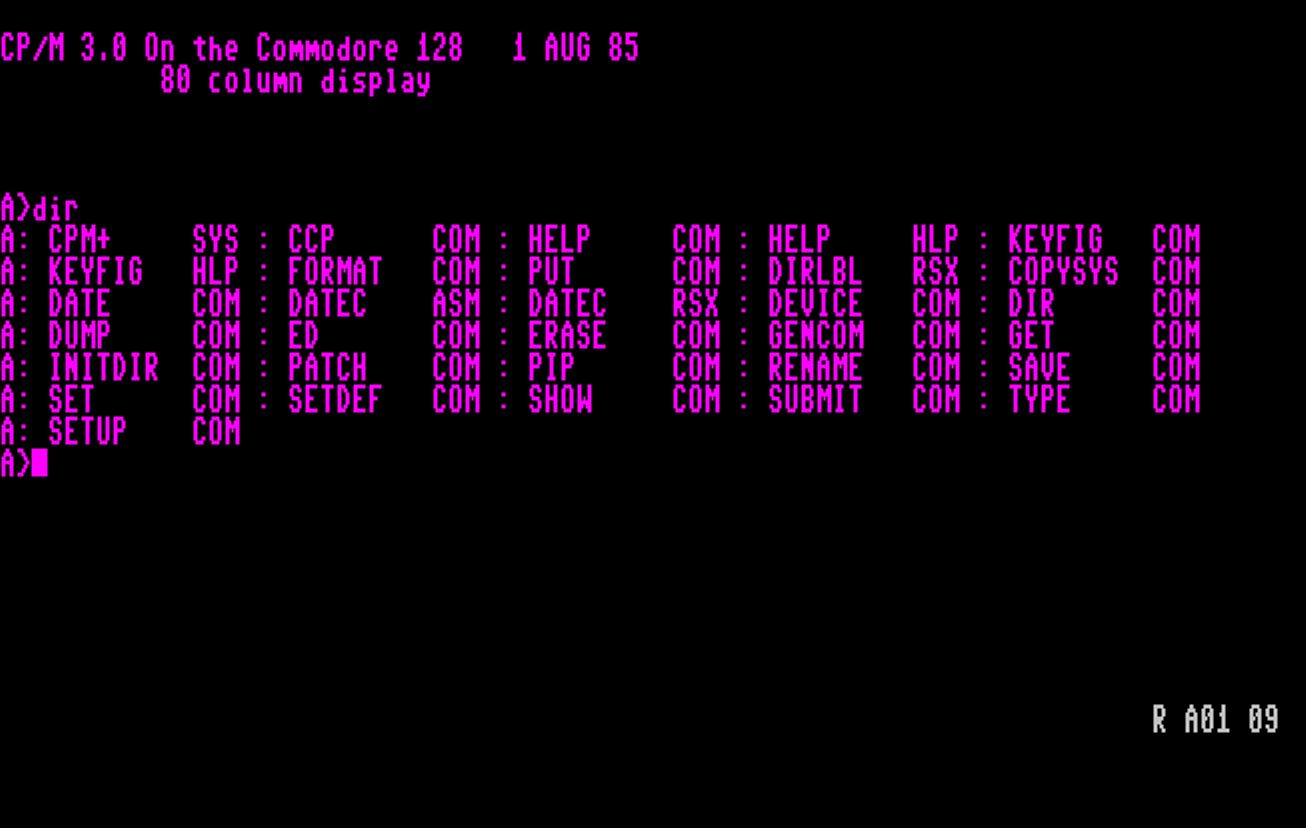
CP/M 3.0 directory listing on a Commodore 128 home computer.

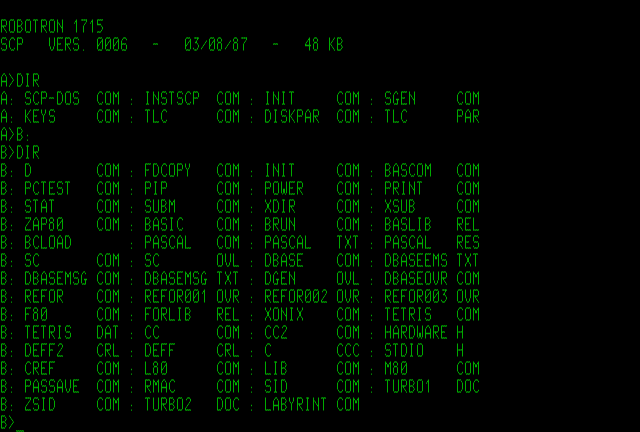
Directory listing on SCP running on a robotron PC 1715.

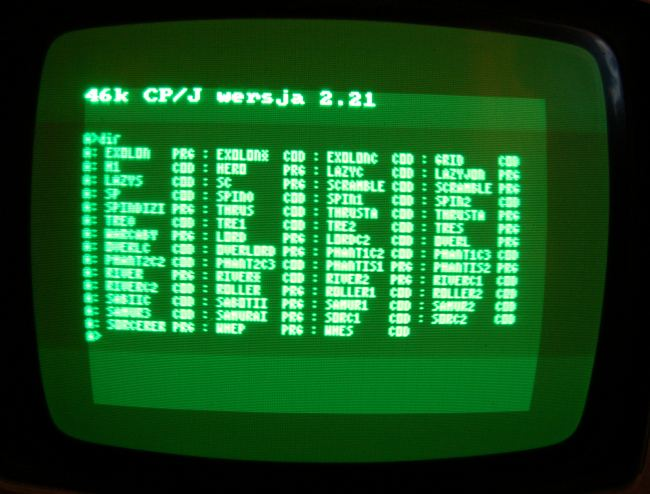
Directory listing on CP/J 2.21 running on an Elwro 804 Junior.

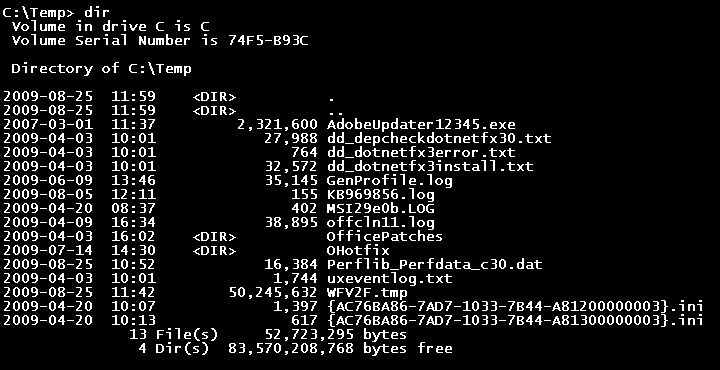
Microsoft Windows Command Prompt showing a directory listing.

List all files and directories in the working directory.

C:\Users>dir

List text and batch files of the working directory by specifying filename extensions ".txt" or ".bat" with the "*" wildcard character that matches any base file name.

C:\Users>dir *.txt *.bat

List files and directories in the specified directory and any subdirectories, recursively, in wide format, pausing after each screen of output. The directory name is enclosed in double-quotes, to prevent it from being interpreted is as two separate command-line options because it contains a space.

C:\Users>dir /s /w /p "C:\Users\johndoe\My Documents"

List any NTFS junction points:

<syntaxhighlight lang="doscon" class="tpl-codett" style="border:none; padding: 0px 0px; color:var(--color-base, #202122); background:transparent; " inline="1">C:\Users>dir /ash</syntaxhighlight>
<syntaxhighlight lang="output" class="tpl-codett" style="border:none; padding: 0px 0px; color:var(--color-base, #202122); background:transparent; " inline="1">Volume in drive C is OS.</syntaxhighlight>
<syntaxhighlight lang="output" class="tpl-codett" style="border:none; padding: 0px 0px; color:var(--color-base, #202122); background:transparent; " inline="1">Volume Serial Number is xxxx-xxxx</syntaxhighlight>
<syntaxhighlight lang="output" class="tpl-codett" style="border:none; padding: 0px 0px; color:var(--color-base, #202122); background:transparent; " inline="1">Directory of C:\Users</syntaxhighlight>
<syntaxhighlight lang="output" class="tpl-codett" style="border:none; padding: 0px 0px; color:var(--color-base, #202122); background:transparent; " inline="1">12/07/2019  02:30 AM    <SYMLINKD>     All Users [C:\ProgramData]</syntaxhighlight>
<syntaxhighlight lang="output" class="tpl-codett" style="border:none; padding: 0px 0px; color:var(--color-base, #202122); background:transparent; " inline="1">12/07/2019  02:30 AM    <JUNCTION>     Default User [C:\Users\Default]</syntaxhighlight>
<syntaxhighlight lang="output" class="tpl-codett" style="border:none; padding: 0px 0px; color:var(--color-base, #202122); background:transparent; " inline="1">12/07/2019  02:12 AM               174 desktop.ini</syntaxhighlight>
              <syntaxhighlight lang="output" class="tpl-codett" style="border:none; padding: 0px 0px; color:var(--color-base, #202122); background:transparent; " inline="1">1 File(s)            174 bytes</syntaxhighlight>
              <syntaxhighlight lang="output" class="tpl-codett" style="border:none; padding: 0px 0px; color:var(--color-base, #202122); background:transparent; " inline="1">2 Dir(s)  332,659,789,824 bytes free</syntaxhighlight>

== See also ==
- Directory (OpenVMS command)
- List of DOS commands
- tree
