= Radisys =

American telecom technology company

Radisys Corporation
- Company Logo
- Type: Subsidiary
- Industry: Technology
- Founded: 1987; 39 years ago
- Headquarters: Beaverton, Oregon, USA; 45°32′07″N 122°53′16″W
- Key people: Arun Bhikshesvaran, President & CEO
- Products: embedded operating systems
- Revenue: $372.6 million USD
- Operating income: ▼$76.4 million USD
- Net income: ▼$65.9 million USD
- Owner: Reliance Industries
- Number of employees: 1,000 (2020)
- Parent: Jio Platforms
- Divisions: Communications networking, commercial systems
- Website: www.radisys.com

Radisys Corporation is an American technology company located in Beaverton, Oregon, United States that makes technology used by telecommunications companies in mobile networks. Founded in 1987 in Oregon by former employees of Intel, the company went public in 1995.

The company's products are used in mobile network applications such as small cell radio access networks, wireless core network elements, deep packet inspection and policy management equipment; conferencing, and media services including voice, video and data. Arun Bhikshesvaran is the company's chief executive officer.

On 30 June 2018, multinational conglomerate Reliance Industries acquired Radisys for $74 million. It now operates as an independent subsidiary.

== History ==
Radisys was founded in 1987 as Radix Microsystems in Beaverton, Oregon, by former Intel engineers Dave Budde and Glen Myers. The first investors were employees who put up $50,000 each, with Tektronix later investing additional funds into the company. Originally located in space leased from Sequent Computer Systems, by 1994 the company had grown to annual sales of $20 million. The company's products were computers used in end products such as automated teller machines to paint mixers. On October 20, 1995, the company became a publicly traded company when it held an initial public offering (IPO). The IPO raised $19.6 million for Radisys after selling 2.7 million shares at $12 per share.

In 1996, the company moved its headquarters to a new campus in Hillsboro, and at that time sales reached $80 million and the company had a profit of $9.6 million that year with 175 employees. Company co-founder Dave Budde left the company in 1997, with company revenues at $81 million annually at that time. The company grew in part by acquisitions such as Sonitech International in 1997, part of IBM's Open Computing Platform unit and Texas Micro in 1999, all of S-Link in 2001, and Microware also in 2001. Radisys also moved some production to China in order to take advantage of the lower manufacturing costs.

In 2002, the company had grown to annual revenues of $200 million, and posted a profit in the fourth quarter for the first time in several quarters. That year Scott Grout was named as chief executive officer of the company and C. Scott Gibson became the chairman of the board, both replacing Glen Myers who co-founded the company. The company sold off its signaling gateway line in 2003.

They raised $97 million through selling convertible senior notes in November 2003. In 2004, the company stopped granting stock options to employees and transitioned to giving restricted shares for some compensation. Radisys grew to annual revenues of $320 million by 2005. The company continued to grow through acquisitions such as a $105 million deal that added Convedia Corp. in 2006. Radisys continued buying assets when it purchased part of Intel's communications business for about $30 million in 2007. After five-straight quarterly losses, the company posted a profit of $481,000 in its 2009 fourth quarter.

In May 2011, the company announced it was buying Continuous Computing for $105 million in stock and cash. Once the transaction was completed in July 2011, Continuous' CEO Mike Dagenais became the CEO of Radisys. Dagenais left the company in October 2012 with former CFO Brian Bronson taking over as CEO. In 2018, Reliance Industries acquired Radisys. Arun Bhikshesvaran took over as CEO in July 2019.

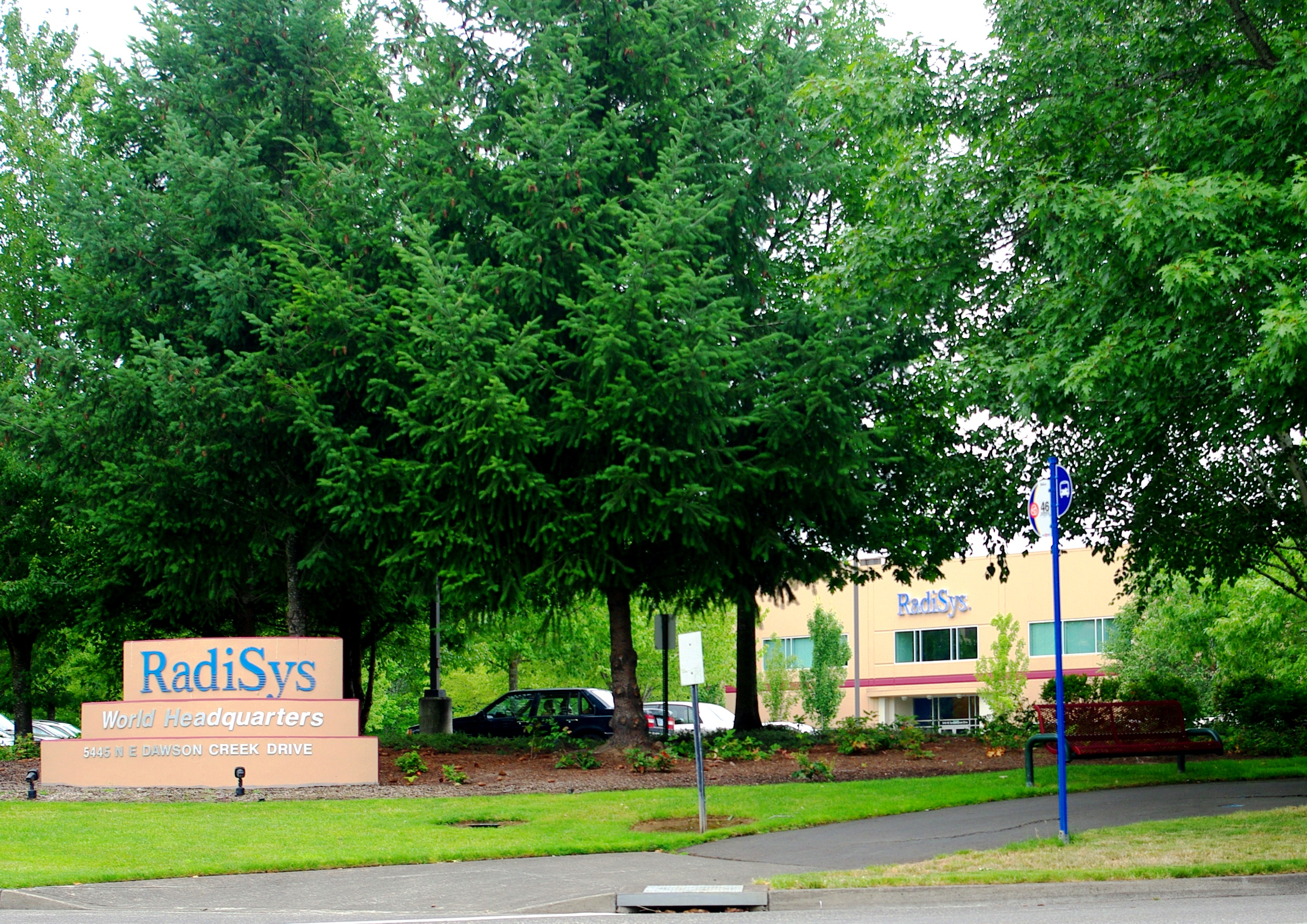
Company headquarters

== Products ==
Radisys supports two markets: communications networking and commercial systems. The latter makes products for use in the testing, medical imaging, defense, and industrial automation fields. For example, end-products that Radisys' is a supplier to as original equipment manufacturers include items such as MRI scanners, ultrasound equipment, logic analyzers, and items used in semiconductor manufacturing. Communications networking equipment includes those for wireless communications, switches, distribution of video, and internet protocol based networking equipment.

The company has engineering groups, working on open telecom architectures, computer architecture and systems integration. In 2009, Radisys' biggest customers were Philips Healthcare, Agilent, Fujitsu, Danaher Corporation, and Nokia Siemens Network (NSN). NSN was the largest single customer, totaling over 43% of revenues.

== See also ==
- RMX (operating system)
- Silicon Forest
- TenAsys
- List of companies based in Oregon
