= TRSDOS =

Operating system for Tandy TRS-80 computers

- Boot Screen of Model 4 TRSDOS 6
- Developer: Tandy
- Working state: Historic
- Source model: Closed source, Source-available software
- Initial release: Model I in 1977; 49 years ago
- Latest release: Model 4 Version 6.2 / 1984; 42 years ago
- Available in: English
- Supported platforms: Zilog Z80-based TRS-80s
- Kernel type: Monolithic
- Default user interface: Command-line interface

TRSDOS (Tandy Radio Shack Disk Operating System) is the operating system for the Tandy TRS-80 line of eight-bit Zilog Z80 microcomputers sold through Radio Shack from 1977 through 1991. Tandy's manuals recommended that it be pronounced triss-doss. TRSDOS should not be confused with Tandy DOS, a version of MS-DOS licensed from Microsoft for Tandy's x86 line of personal computers (PCs).

With the original TRS-80 Model I of 1977, TRSDOS was primarily a way of extending the MBASIC (BASIC in ROM) with additional I/O (input/output) commands that worked with disk files rather than the cassette tapes that were used by non-disk Model I systems. Later disk-equipped Model III computers used a completely different version of TRSDOS by Radio Shack which culminated in 1981 with TRSDOS Version 1.3. From 1983 disk-equipped TRS-80 Model 4 computers used TRSDOS Version 6, which was a development of Model III LDOS by Logical Systems, Inc. This last was updated in 1987 and released as LS-DOS 6.3.

Completely unrelated was a version of TRSDOS by Radio Shack for its TRS-80 Model II and TRS-80 Model 12 professional computers from 1979, also based on the Z80 and equipped with 8-inch disk drives. The later machines in this line, the Models 16 and 16B and Tandy 6000, used the Z80 as an I/O processor for its main Motorola 68000 chip when running operating systems on the 68000, and could run the Model II version of TRSDOS for backwards compatibility with older Z80 applications software. When running the older Z80 operating systems, the 68000 was unused.

== History ==
Tandy Corporation's TRS-80 microcomputer did not have a disk drive or disk operating system at release. The first version of TRSDOS, by Randy Cook, was so buggy that others wrote alternatives, including NewDOS and LDOS. After disputes with Cook over ownership of the source code, Tandy hired Logical Systems, LDOS's developer, to continue TRSDOS development. TRSDOS 6, shipped with the TRS-80 Model 4 in 1983, is identical to LDOS 6.00.

=== Dates ===
- October, 1979 – Radio Shack releases TRSDOS 2.3
- May 1, 1981 – Radio Shack releases Model III TRSDOS 1.3
- April 26, 1983 – Radio Shack introduces TRSDOS Version 6.0 with the new Model 4s
- 1984 – Radio Shack releases Version 6.2, the definitive version for the Model 4
- 1984 – Logical Systems publishes The Source, the commented assembler source code to TRSDOS 6.2
- Late 1986 – Logical Systems releases LS-DOS 6.3, the functionally equivalent update to TRSDOS 6.2. From this date, Tandy/Radio Shack ships it with the Model 4D.

== Features and capabilities ==
Radio Shack's Z80-based line of TRS-80 computers (Models I/III and Model 4) support up to four physical floppy (mini-diskette) drives which (as sold) use 5¼-inch diskettes. The original TRSDOS for the Model I supported only single-sided disks with 35 tracks formatted in single density (sectors are encoded using the frequency modulation technique). Model III TRSDOS (culminating in version 1.3) supported 40-track disks formatted in double density (using modified frequency modulation). Model Is retrofitted with double density controllers and Models I/III equipped with 80-track drives or double-sided drives could not use TRSDOS; RadioShack sold Logical System's LDOS operating system which could control these types of drives. The Model 4's TRSDOS 6 is a development of LDOS and has the same capabilities.

Hard disk drives (then also known as Winchester drives) required custom driver software supplied by their manufacturers. These drivers permitted any TRSDOS installation to access them with up to eight possible drive partitions, each assigned to drive numbers zero through seven. A large hard drive could be formatted with more than eight partitions, but TRSDOS can only access eight drives during any one session. Hard drives could have some partitions formatted under TRSDOS and others under the CP/M OS. Each floppy drive in the system would also take up one drive number assignment. The Model 4 could also create and use a ramdisk (Memdisk), which would then also require a drive number assigned to it.

All versions of TRSDOS use overlays to satisfy most system requests, and disk directories are not maintained in memory. This has two implications for system performance. First, upon initial file access the DOS always references the disk directory to obtain information giving the physical mapping of disk space allocated to the file (including its extents, if any). After the initial access this information is maintained in a File Control Block, the memory space for which is supplied by the calling application. Further references do not need to read the disk directory (unless the file is written to and more disk space needs to be allocated). For this reason system performance depends greatly on how close a file's allocated disk space(s) is/are to the directory cylinder, and how fragmented (having extents located in non-contiguous locations) the file is. The farther away the directory cylinder is, the more the drive's read/write head will need to move, which slows disk access and produces more mechanical wear on the drive. TRSDOS has commands permitting the user to optimize placement of particular files on the disk's physical space, and a FREE command, which displays a map of a file's physical placement on a drive.

The second implication of the overlay-based architecture is that a disk containing TRSDOS system files (file extension /SYS) must always be present in whichever drive is assigned as logical drive number zero. (On the Model 4 this may be the Memdisk, thus freeing physical drive zero be used for a non-system data disk). LDOS and TRSDOS 6 have a SYSRES command which loads selected system files into Z80 RAM, thus freeing space on the system disk for non-system data. All versions have variants of the SYSTEM command which can reassign logical drive numbers to physical drives. It is possible to assign drive numbers in a way that a physical drive is unassigned a logical drive number; this is sometimes useful to guarantee that the drive cannot be accessed for security or safety (write protection) purposes. (Drives may also be set by the DOS to be write protected.)

=== Disk management ===
The primary function of any disk operating system is to provide the user with a facility for managing and accessing files stored on disk storage devices. Since the user must not be burdened with the physical details of the storage devices themselves, it is the operating system's responsibility to translate file record access requests into specific drive, track, sector, and head parameters that pinpoint the storage location of each record.

The system also maintains a Drive Control Table in Z80 memory within TRSDOS that stores the parameters associated with each of the eight logical drives. Disk drive parameters control how the total storage space on a drive is divided up into addressable units. The layer(s) of magnetic particles on the surface of the disk media are magnetized (during the format process) into concentric circles of storage areas called tracks. Each track is divided into 256-byte sub-areas called sectors. Each sector is uniquely identified by a pattern of information preceding each sector called an ID field. Although the number of sectors per track may vary from one media type to another, the number of sectors in each track of the same media (and in each granule) must always be a constant.

Disks are organized as follows: each track is formatted into a specific number of 256-byte sectors with a maximum capacity of 32 sectors per track. Sectors are grouped into blocks called granules, which vary in size according to total track capacity of the disk media, although granule size for each disk format is constant. For forty-cylinder disks formatted in double density, standard for the drives installed in the TRS-80 Models III and 4, the granule size is six 256-byte sectors, or 1.5 KB. Each track has three granules for 4.5 KB of storage. Each side (surface) of the disk is normally formatted with 40 tracks, yielding 180 KB per side. The Model 4D, with its double-sided drives, yields 360 KB of storage. Whenever additional disk space is needed for a file (such as extending a file while being written to), an additional granule is allocated. The granule thus becomes the minimum size storage unit.

TRSDOS assigns numbers to every sector, every track, and every surface. Surfaces are numbered consecutively starting from zero. Tracks are numbered consecutively starting from zero at the outermost edge of the disk giving the innermost track the highest number. Where multiple-head drives are in use, the track numbers on a surface are duplicated on each surface with all similarly numbered tracks constituting a cylinder. For a double-sided floppy disk as formatted on a Model 4D, track zero of surface zero and track zero of surface one are grouped together into cylinder zero. Cylinder capacities also have an upper limit of 256 sectors per cylinder or eight granules per cylinder, while the system supports (for hard drives with multiple platters of storage media) a maximum of eight heads per drive.

The disk's directory cylinder is placed during the format process on the middle-numbered cylinder; thus a standard 40 cylinder disk has its directory installed on cylinder 20. This reduces the average distance (and access time) that the drive's read/write head must move to access the directory. The first sector of the disk directory contains the Granule Allocation Table (GAT). The GAT is bitmapped to each granule of space on the drive. Other fields in the GAT contain the pack name, date of creation (when the disk was formatted), pack password, and data pertaining to the configuration of the drive.

When a file is to be opened for access, the system needs to search the directory for its directory record. Search time is minimized by using a hashing technique to reduce the 11-character string formed from the file name and extension to a one byte value. The hash code for each file is stored in a Hash Index Table (HIT) which is the second sector of the directory. Each position in this table corresponds to a specific directory entry record. The hash table, being one sector in length, can index a maximum of 256 directory records or files. The directory itself is sized according to disk capacity by being a maximum of one cylinder (up to 34 sectors). Thus, the larger the disk storage capacity, the larger its directory, and the greater the number of file names that can be stored on the disk.

The directory record contains information such as the date the file was last modified, its update and access password codes, its access level, and other attributes such as whether it is a SYStem or PDS (Partitioned Data Set) file and if a backup has been made, the relative number of the last sector in the file, and the last byte within the last sector (or End Of File). The record also contains the physical area(s) in use by the file, by pointing to the cylinder, relative starting granule, and number of contiguous granules for each extent comprising the file. When a file has more than four extents, additional directory records are used as required with forward and backward pointers linking each record of each file. Thus the theoretical maximum of 256 files possible on a floppy diskette is realizable only if there is no file fragmentation.

When TRSDOS formats a disk, all of the parameters associated with the diskette are predetermined. Thus the number of sectors per track, number of sectors per granule and thus the granules per track, number of sides (surfaces), and number of cylinders are all designated, as well as the density of the media. Some of these figures (density, sides, granules per track) are written to fields in the Granule Allocation Table which is part of the disk directory. Others (sectors per track, sectors per granule, in addition to the former quantities) are part of the Drive Control Table fields. When the system attempts to open a file on a disk, it uses the @CKDRV SVC to ascertain the availability of the disk, and then logs the disk once it finds it available. This "logging" function will update the DIRCYL field, then update the DBLBIT and MAXCYL fields based on information stored in the GAT. This procedure frees the user from having to manually log a newly inserted disk; he is at liberty to change differently formatted disks in any drive without concern that the system will incorrectly access it.

The SVC disk primitives are funneled through common system routines contained in the driver software installed for each type of disk storage device. The driver for Model III or Model 4 floppy drives is named $FD and is located in the TRSDOS low memory region. Hard disk drives are supplied with their own driver software, and are usually installed in high memory (main 64K Z80 RAM) above the system HIGH$ pointer, since room in the low memory region is usually insufficient (especially on the Model 4 since software needed to access its external memory banks cannot reside in high Z80 RAM memory because that region exists in the banked RAM swap area). These driver routines establish a linkage protocol between the application requesting disk access and the computer's Floppy Disk Controller hardware. TRS-80s use controller chips from the Western Digital series: the WD1791 in the Model 4 non-gate array version, and the WD1773 in the Model 4 Gate Array version. When an I/O request is invoked by a higher level SVC, such as a request to READ a file record, the request is translated to that disk primitive (FDC command or status report) needed to satisfy the function request. The linkage protocol is uniform across all disk devices that are connected to the system. This makes the access of files transparent to size or nature of the disk device within the scope of the parameters stored in the DCT for that drive.

=== File management ===
Disk files are supported with two types of access: record I/O and character I/O. Logical records of from one to 256 bytes in length can be read or written using the @READ or @WRITE SVC requests. Record I/O can be random access (by position SVC requests prior to READ/WRITE) or sequential access using repetitive READs or WRITEs. Character (or byte) I/O is accomplished by @GET and @PUT SVC requests and is essentially the same as record I/O with a logical record length (LRL) equal to one. (Physical access to a disk storage device is always in units of 256 byte sectors. This is fixed by the TRS-80 disk controller hardware). However, if GET or PUT are used to implement sequential access, then a file can be considered a character I/O device just like a printer, a serial port, or a video display device. A byte I/O request is therefore independent of the physical device "connected" to the control block which is requesting the I/O. This makes the system "device independent".

Filenames are limited to eight alphanumeric characters (the first character must be alpha) which are case insensitive (only capital letters are used; any lowercase letters entered are capitalized). File extensions are up to three characters and obey the same rules. File passwords are up to eight characters obeying the same rules (TRSDOS 6 versions up to 6.2 support both owner and user passwords). Entire diskettes can also be assigned master passwords, which may limit user access via the BACKUP and PURGE commands.

Under TRSDOS and LDOS the system is never "logged in" to any current drive as with CP/M, PC DOS and MS-DOS. The system prompt is always TRSDOS Ready. All file access requests (whether issued by the user at the console or a program being executed) are satisfied by searching the directory of the first drive specified (taken as drive zero if no drive number is given) and, if the requested file is not found, then searching the next (higher numbered) drive in the system. This continues until the file is found or all the drives in the system have been searched (but see below for variations on this rule).

Drive numbers are specified with a colon : followed immediately by the drive number. The colon is optional unless the drive specification is used as a suffix for a filename. Using the DIR directory command as an example:

- DIR displays all files starting with logical drive zero, then drive one, and so on.
- DIR :4 or DIR 4 searches logical drive four (for all files, as always when no filename is given).
- DIR :4-6 or DIR 4-6 searches logical drives four, five, and six.
- DIR :4- or DIR 4- searches logical drives four, five, six and seven.
- DIR FILENAME:2 searches for FILENAME on logical drive two.
- DIR FILENAME:2- searches for FILENAME on all logical drives starting from drive two.

As seen, the dash character - is used to specify a range of drive numbers. The DIR and CAT (catalog) commands display all file specifications (filespecs) matching the query on all drives. Other commands/utilities such as BACKUP, COPY and PURGE, and drive searches initiated by programs being executed, stop searching at the first drive found to match. If the same filespec exists on multiple drives, then those files on higher-numbered drives will be excluded.

File access by partial filenames (partspecs), file extensions, and file dates are supported. For example:

- DIR SAMPLE will select files SAMPLE, SAMPLE1, SAMPLE23 and SAMPLEIT.
- DIR /BAS will select files SAMPLE/BAS, TEST/BAS, EXAMPLE/BAS, etc.

As with the DIR example earlier, drive specifications (drivespecs) may be appended to filespecs. These examples assume the selected files have not been made invisible in the disk directory. File access requests issued by applications programs running under TRSDOS work the same way.

=== Command-line interface ===
Under TRSDOS/LS-DOS 6.x, the standard system command interpreter (SYS1/SYS) can be functionally replaced with a custom interpreter by copying the new interpreter to the system file SYS13/SYS (which in an unmodified installation is a dummy file). This can be any machine code /CMD program file. This is referred to in the documentation as an "Extended Command Interpreter" or ECI.

TRSDOS/LS-DOS 6.x support wildcard characters in filenames, both the single character ? and multicharacter *.

TRSDOS (version II) was notable for the inclusion of noise words, similar to the 1959 COBOL specification. These made commands more English-like. For example, the following commands functioned identically:

- COPY filea fileb
- COPY filea TO fileb

Since TRSDOS does not have the concept of I/O redirection as UNIX/Linux and MS-DOS do, the APPEND command is somewhat different in concept than the UNIX or MS-DOS notion of appending via output redirection. TRSDOS/LS-DOS 6.x do provide I/O redirection for system devices (keyboard *KI, display screen *DO, printer *PR, serial port *CL), as well as between devices and disk files. The DEVICE command displays a map of I/O links and routes. Under DOS and UNIX, printing a file can be done with redirection; under UNIX it is normally done by spooling the file to the "line printer" (using the lpr command) because UNIX is conventionally a multi-user system. TRSDOS/LS-DOS 6.x print jobs can be redirected (such as to a disk file) by applying the LINK or ROUTE commands to the system *PR device.

TRSDOS/LS-DOS 6.x do not support subdirectories or user areas. However, the DIR and CAT (catalog) commands for displaying file data support the usual partial filenames, suffixes, and file dates. Under TRSDOS/LS-DOS 6.x files can be made invisible to the DIR and CAT commands, and can be displayed with the INV parameter (unless any files are password protected and the correct p/w is not given).

TRSDOS/LS-DOS 6.3 can dump the video screen to the line printer by pressing CTRL+:.

Many versions support a simple password security for files and programs, with separate Read/Execute and full access capabilities. ex: filename/ext.password:drive#. TRSDOS 6.x supports both Owner and User passwords (8 characters max) for disk files. LS-DOS 6.3 uses the space for the User password for its extended dating scheme (past December 31, 1987). Both Model 4 OSes can set various file access levels and permit software write protection for disk files and entire disks.

==== Commands ====
Although MS-DOS owes its heritage most closely to CP/M and thence to TOPS-10, many of the file manipulation commands are similar to those of TRSDOS. Some of the following TRSDOS commands exist on disk as distinct program files (DIR/CMD, FORMAT/CMD, BACKUP/CMD) while all others exist as modules condensed into the library files (technically Partitioned Data Sets or PDSes) SYS6/SYS, SYS7/SYS and SYS8/SYS; these include TRSDOS commands such as CAT, COPY, LIST, REMOVE and RENAME.

Some typical TRSDOS utilities:

TRSDOS commands and counterparts in other operating systems
Command	MS-DOS, OS/2, Windows	Unix, Unix-like	Description
APPEND	type file1 >> file2	cat file >> file2	Under TRSDOS 6.x, the source of the appended data may be a system input device such as *KI. Thus whatever is typed at the keyboard will be appended to the target file. Use RESET *KI to end this function.
ATTRIB	attrib	chmod	ATTRIB, PROT, and the chmod UNIX command are all somewhat different in their semantics. UNIX/Linux is multi-user and each user can control read, write, and execute permissions on his or her own files and directories. MS-DOS is single user and the file attributes for "read-only," "hidden," and "system" are advisory in nature. TRSDOS was single user. TRSDOS 6.x ATTRIB can modify protection status of all files on a disk volume if the disk's master password is given. All user and owner passwords on visible files can be removed with a single ATTRIB command.
AUTO	AUTOEXEC.BAT	~/.profile or ~/.login or /etc/rc*	The AUTO command sets an automatic command to be executed on TRSDOS boot; under MS-DOS the special, reserved file named AUTOEXEC.BAT contained a list of such commands. TRSDOS/LS-DOS 6.x support Job Control Language in which any text file with the suffix /JCL could batch process (using the DO command) any number of executable program files. Such a file could be the object of an AUTO command. On UNIX a set of one or more rc files under /etc/ are a set of boot time "run commands" and special "dot files" in a user's home directory are run for each time that a given user logs into the system. UNIX supports many other "dotfiles" for many of its commands which are akin to the Macintosh "preferences" folder contents.
BACKUP	diskcopy, tar	tar, cpio, pax, (many others)	TRSDOS/LS-DOS 6.x include the BACKUP/CMD utility which can mass copy files specified by partial filename matches, file suffixes (e.g. such as /CMD or /BAS), or by file date. BACKUP can be made to first query for permission to copy each file with the (Q=Y)) parameter. On single drive computers the X parameter will permit copying between two disks by prompting the user when to switch disks in the drive.
CAT			The TRSDOS CATalog command displays one line giving information on the selected drive (disk name, capacity, date) and a listing of the filenames with their extensions present on the disk. This is an abbreviated version of the DIRectory command, which permits more file information to be presented on a single video screen with less need for scrolling to view the contents of the entire disk. CAT uses the same parameters as DIR for viewing INVisible and SYStem files.
CLOCK	prompt $t *	in some shells: PS1="...\t..." *	CLOCK installs an interrupt task that shows the system time in the upper corner of the display; no exactly corresponding feature exists in MS-DOS or UNIX, though many programs provided similar features for DOS and the common UNIX shells could embed the time into their user-defined "prompt string".
CLS	cls	clear	Clear video display and home cursor
COMM			Under TRSDOS 6.x, COMM/CMD is a terminal program that establishes communications between the Model 4's RS-232C serial port and that of another computer, a modem or serial printer/plotter. Must first install the driver for the serial port, COM/DVR using the SET command, which establishes the system *CL (Comm Line) device. Use SETCOM/CMD to set parameters for communication.
COPY	copy	cp	Under TRSDOS 6.x, the COPY command can be used to transfer information between system devices as well as disk files. For example, COPY *KI *PR will turn the computer (if connected to an active line printer) into a typewriter, as each character typed at the keyboard is sent to the *PR device as well as the *DO device. This is effectively the same as the TRSDOS command LINK *KI *PR. Use RESET *KI to turn off this function.
DEBUG	debug		Optional filespec also performs LOAD function on a target /CMD machine code program; (ext) loads additional debugger commands from system file SYS9/SYS
DEVICE			Displays the status of the system drives and system logical devices, as well as the existing ROUTEs and LINKs between them.
DIR	dir	ls	DIR displays the same files that would be selected by the BACKUP command, and so is useful as a preview tool. Parameter (p) sends the directory listing to the line printer, which in turn can be ROUTEd or LINKed to a disk file.
DISKCOPY	diskcopy		LS-DOS 6.3 includes the DISKCOPY/CMD utility which makes an exact copy of a source disk by formatting and copying to a blank destination disk.
FILTER			FILTER is used to attach a /FLT filter program to a system device. Three included with TRSDOS 6.x are FORMS/FLT which is used for formatted printing, KSM/FLT which is a keyboard macro facility, and CLICK/FLT which causes the Model 4 speaker to beep every time a key is pressed.
FORMAT	format	mkfs	Defaults to 40 track, single-sided on Models III and 4, double-sided on Model 4D. Number of tracks per side can be specified using parameter (CYL=nn). All Model 4Ds and most Model 4s can format 42 tracks although drives supplied by Radio Shack are nominally 40 track.
FORMS			Under TRSDOS 6.x, sets parameters for data sent to the system *PR device after the FORMS filter has been attached to the *PR device. These include number of characters per printed line, lines per page, margins, added linefeed characters, etc.
FREE	chkdsk	df	TRSDOS 6.x displays ASCII map showing disk granules occupied by active files with xxxxxx; the directory cylinder is shown as DDDDDD.
GETDISK/GETTAPE	?	dd	
KILL	del	rm	Starting with TRSDOS 6.0 KILL was replaced by REMOVE (per LSI Journal article "Thou Shalt Not Kill")
LIST	type	cat	Under TRSDOS/LS-DOS 6.x, the LIST command can display or print the contents of non-ASCII files with the HEX parameter. The listing can be paused using ⇧ Shift+@.
LOAD filespec	(no equivalent)	(no equivalent)	Program invocation under TRSDOS, DOS and UNIX is done by filename; no explicit LOAD command is required for normal binary executables nor for text command files (batch files in DOS and shell scripts in UNIX/Linux). The LOAD command under TRSDOS would load a binary program into memory, but would not execute it; neither DOS nor UNIX has an equivalent. LOAD under TRSDOS is almost always used to make a machine code Z80 program (/CMD file) available to the system debugger for examination or modification.
MEMORY			The MEMORY command shows the names and sizes of memory resident modules. It is also used to modify system flag bytes. For example, flag A is the DOS Allocation byte, which the BACKUP command uses to specify the beginning cylinder of a disk to start copying files. This gives the user control over the physical placement of files on disks, which is important to minimize movement of the drive's read/write head during file access.
PATCH	?	patch	All versions of TRSDOS include the PATCH/CMD utility. This permits modification of machine code /CMD files using patch data supplied by a /FIX file in hexadecimal ASCII format.
PRINT	type file >> prn	lpr	Under TRSDOS 6.x an interrupt task is provided to dump the current video display to a line printer at any time. This is activated using CTRL+:. If the system *PR device is ROUTED or LINKED to a disk file it will be sent there.
PURGE			TRSDOS/LS-DOS 6.x support the PURGE command which will mass delete files specified by partial filename, file suffixes, or file dates. PURGE will query the user for permission to delete each file unless the (Q=N) parameter is given.
RENAME	ren or rename	mv	Under TRSDOS 6.x the user may rename individual files or the entire diskette.
TAPE100			TAPE100/CMD reads and writes cassette tapes recorded by the TRS-80 Model 100 laptop as TRSDOS 6.x disk files. This requires use of the Model 4 cassette interface, which the Model 4P transportable lacks.

== Example code ==
The following Z80 assembler source code is for a subroutine named HELLO_WORLD. This is an introductory program which will print a message to the video display and then exit. Though simple, it demonstrates how an assembler source code is formatted and interacts with the display hardware through TRSDOS. The example uses TRS-80 Model 4 running TRSDOS/LS-DOS 6.x, produced by Tandy/Radio Shack and Logical Systems, with most any assembler sold by Radio Shack or Misosys Inc. (Series I/EDTASM, ALDS, EDAS or MRAS with -GC switch).

            
            
            
            
            
            
            
            
            
    
  
  
  
  
  
3000 3E 69
3002 EF 
3003 21 14 30
3006 3E 0A
3008 EF
3009 0E 0D
300B 3E 02
300D EF
300E 21 00 00
3011 3E 16
3013 EF
3014 48 65 6C 6C
3018 6F 2C 20 77
301C 6F 72 6C 64
3020 21 0D 0D
3023

 ; hello_world_TRS-80 Model 4
 ; Print "Hello, world!" then exit to TRSDOS Ready
 ;
 ; Entry registers: none
 ; Return registers: none
 ;
 ; values below are decimal unless suffixed by H
 ; the term "pseudo-op" means same as "assembler directive", is not Z80 code
 ;
 @CLS         EQU     105                 ; EQU pseudo-op sets @CLS text label = TRSDOS Supervisor Code
 @DSP         EQU     2                   ; set @DSP text label = TRSDOS SVC to send char to display
 @DSPLY       EQU     10                  ; set @DSPLY text label = SVC for text string display
 @EXIT        EQU     22                  ; set @EXIT text label = SVC for returning to TRSDOS Ready
;
              ORG     3000H               ; ORG pseudo-op sets standard start address under TRSDOS 6.x
START         LD      A,@CLS              ; CLS = Clear Screen, erase display and home cursor
              RST     40                  ; Z80 Restart instruction for system SVC processor, execute @CLS
              LD      HL,MSG              ; point to message string with HL (required by @DSPLY SVC)
              LD      A,@DSPLY            ; send text string to *DO Display Output device (video screen)
              RST     40                  ; execute @DSPLY SVC (13d byte needed to terminate string)
              LD      C,13                ; now send another carriage return, needed in reg C 
              LD      A,@DSP              ; to set off Hello message from TRSDOS Ready prompt
              RST     40                  ; once we exit to system
              LD      HL,0                ; indicate no error condition to Command Interpreter
              LD      A,@EXIT             ; return to TRSDOS Ready
              RST     40                  ; (stack integrity maintained, could as well have used a RET!)
 MSG          DB      'Hello, world!',13  ; DB = Define Byte pseudo-op assembles ASCII string to Z80 memory
 CR           DB      13                  ; 13d byte is ASCII carriage return char, moves cursor down
 
              END     START               ; END pseudo-op required by assembler 
                                          ; to produce transfer record to program entry point
