= Concise Command Language =

Computer language

Concise Command Language (CCL)
- Developer: Digital Equipment Corporation
- Operating system: OS/8, TOPS-10, RT-11, RSTS/E
- Platform: PDP-6, PDP-8, PDP-10, PDP-11
- Successor: DIGITAL Command Language (DCL)
- Available in: English
- Type: Command shell

Concise Command Language (CCL) was the term used by Digital Equipment Corporation for the command-line interpreter / user interface supplied on several of their computing systems; its successor was named DIGITAL Command Language (DCL).

CCL provides the user with an extensive set of terminal commands.

The first operating system to include CCL was DEC's TOPS-10.

== History ==
The PDP-6 monitor came with a simple set of commands. To compile and run a FORTRAN program, one would

1. .R F4 ——— invoke the FORTRAN compiler
2. *DTA1:PROG3=DTA2:PROG3,SUB3A,SUB3B ——— specify binary output and source input
3. .R LOADER 30 ——— invoke the loader, allocate 30K of memory
4. *DTA1:PROG3 ——— specify binary object to load
5. *SYS:/S ——— let the loader find the appropriate subroutine libraries
6. .SAVE DTA1:PROG3 ——— write the executable to DTA1

(The .(DOT) is a monitor prompt and the *(Star/Asterisk) is an application prompt)

The PDP-10 monitor (later called TOPS-10) had CCL. Key to its improvements over its predecessor were:

- multi-step commands: .EX PROG3,SUB3A,SUB3B
  - would check to see if any of the 3 needed to be recompiled (and did so if necessary)
  - run the object program loader (including needed subroutine libraries)
  - start running the program
- advanced command file: .EX @RUNPROG3.CMD
  - would run the command(s) in the .CMD file

== Commands ==
The following table contains a list of CCL commands.

List of CCL commands
CCL command		Description
Short form	Full form	Description
BAC	BACKSPACE	Runs CAMP. A magnetic tape or cassette is spaced backward a specified number of files or records.
BO	BOOT	
CCL	CCL	Disables the CCL program on the OS/8 Keyboard Monitor residing on the system device.
COMP	COMPARE	Runs SRCCOM. Compares/shows differences between two source files. Although line by line, permits "catch up."
COM	COMPILE	Produces binary files and/or compilation listings for specified program files.
COP	COPY	Transfers files from one I/O device to another.
COR	CORE	
CREA	CREATE	Runs EDIT and opens a new file for creation.
CREF	CREF	
DA	DATE	
DEA	DEASSIGN	
DEL	DELETE	Deletes one or more files from disk or DECtape.
DIR	DIRECT	
ED	EDIT	Runs EDIT. Opens an already existing file for editing.
EOF	EOF	
EXE	EXECUTE	
HE	HELP	Prints information on specified OS/8 programs.
LI	LIST	
LO	LOAD	
MAK	MAKE	Runs TECO. Opens the specified file for output.
MAP	MAP	Runs BITMAP.
MUNG	MUNG	Runs a TECO Macro; command line parameters give added adaptability.
PAL	PAL	Runs PAL8. Assembles the source file specified as the argument.
PRI	PRINT	Runs a program named LPTSPL.
PU	PUNCH	Runs PIP. Punches the file specified on paper tape.
REN	RENAME	Renames one or more files on disk or DECtape.
RES	RES	Runs RESORC.
REW	REWIND	
SKIP	SKIP	
SQ	SQUISH	Runs PIP's "squeeze" / defrag tool
SU	SUBMIT	Runs the BATCH program.
TE	TECO	(Text Editor and COrrector, a sophisticated text editor with MACRO capabilities).
TY	TYPE	
UA	UA	
UB	UB	
UC	UC	
UNL	UNLOAD	
VER	VERSION	Prints the version numbers of the OS/8 Keyboard Monitor and CCL.
ZERO	ZERO	
