= 4690 Operating System =

Operating system formerly developed by IBM

- Developer: (Digital Research, Novell, IMS), IBM, Toshiba
- Written in: C Supported languages: IBM 4680 BASIC, Metaware High-C, Java 2
- Working state: Current
- Source model: Proprietary
- Initial release: July 1993; 33 years ago
- Final release: V6R5 CSD 2010 / December 18, 2020; 5 years ago
- Marketing target: Point of sale
- Available in: English
- Package manager: Proprietary ASM (Apply Software Maintenance) System
- Supported platforms: Point of sale terminals
- Kernel type: Real-time operating system
- Default user interface: Command-line interface, some screens spawn a Java-based graphical user interface (GUI)
- License: Proprietary
- Preceded by: FlexOS 386, 4680 OS, REAL/32
- Succeeded by: TCx Sky
- Official website: Toshiba Commerce: Operating Systems

4690 Operating System (sometimes shortened to 4690 OS or 4690) is a specially designed point of sale (POS) operating system, originally sold by IBM. In 2012, IBM sold its retail business, including this product, to Toshiba, which assumed support. 4690 is widely used by IBM and Toshiba retail customers to run retail systems which run their own applications and others. Retailers have used the 4690 Operating System for their operations because of its many retail-specific and reliability features. In addition to running on IBM hardware, third-party vendors have exploited the 4690 features on competitive hardware.

== History ==
4690 is the successor product to IBM 4680 OS, which was in use by IBM customers since 1986. The original 4680 OS was based on Digital Research's Concurrent DOS 286, a system thereafter renamed to FlexOS 286 in November 1986. In July 1993, IBM adopted FlexOS version 2.32 as the basis of their 4690 OS version 1. FlexOS 2.32 supported 286 (Intel 80286) and 386 (Intel 80386) modes and had no limit on applications running concurrently. In 1995, IBM licensed IMS REAL/32 7.50, a derivative of Digital Research's Multiuser DOS and thereby a successor to Concurrent DOS 386, to bundle it with their 4695 POS terminals.

According to the article "The Year of the Store?", IHL Consulting Group/RIS News, IBM 4690 OS still had a market share of 12% in the POS register client market in June 2005, when IBM was starting to phase it out in favor of IBM Retail Environment for SUSE (IRES). IBM continued to maintain 4690 OS until April 2015, with the most recent version released by IBM in May 2012 being IBM 4690 OS Version 6 Release 3, which was supported until 2017 under special contracts with big-name companies.

Meanwhile, Toshiba has released Toshiba 4690 OS Version 6 Release 4 (V6R4) in January 2014, and Version 6 Release 5 (V6R5) in January 2016. In May 2018, a Linux-based successor of 4690 OS, named TCx Sky and codeveloped with Wind River Systems, was launched. Soon after, Toshiba discontinued 4690 OS for new customers; it is, however, still supported under service contracts signed between Toshiba Global Commerce Solutions and stores still using 4690 OS on their POS terminals. The latest security update (CSD Level 2010) was released in December 2020, only for 4690 OS Version 6 Release 5.

== Supported hardware ==
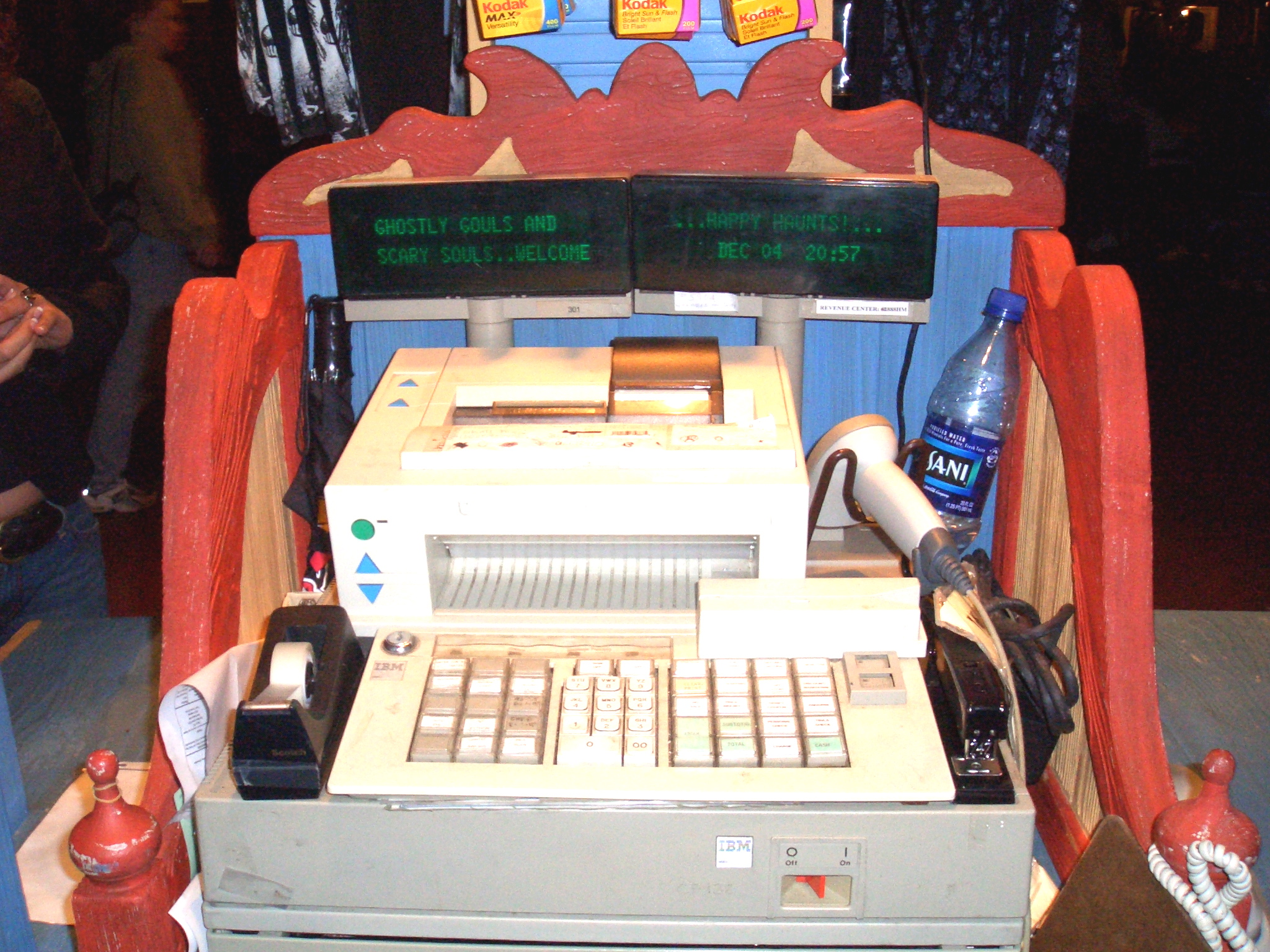
This IBM 4683 register uses a controller with a 4690 operating system.

4690 supports many POS terminal devices, store controller servers, and combination controller–terminals. The 4690 documentation contains a list of supported POS devices, some in use over 20 years. The family of IBM Universal Serial Bus (USB) POS devices that 4690 supports includes keyboards, displays, and cash drawers. 4690 also supports other input/output (I/O) devices designed and conforming to IBM's USB POS device interface specifications. IBM makes interface specifications available to third-party vendors to enable them to connect their devices to POS terminals using RS-485, RS-232, and USB connections.

IBM provides a Controller Matrix document with a list of compatible IBM servers for use with 4690 OS as store controllers and controller–terminals. These servers represent current and formerly available devices which continue to be supported by 4690.

== Notable features ==
Perhaps the most notable feature of the 4690 OS is its ability to provide a "redundancy infrastructure". IBM designed the 4690 OS to work either as one server, or with one or more other 4690 servers. These servers are commonly called store controllers. When connected in a local area network (LAN), these 4690 store controllers provide redundant backup using mirrored data files. Using a system of master controller, alternate master, file server, and alternate file server designations, the controllers preserve data integrity and allow file backup in case a store controller fails and needs to be replaced.

A copy of the 4690 OS is maintained in each store controller. The 4690 POS terminals (registers) load a copy of 4690 from the store controller into memory when they Initial Program Load (IPL). The 4690 controllers provide terminal support in the form of terminal loading, price lookup, and transaction logging. Non-volatile memory is used to ensure that data is not lost in transit from the terminals to the store controller. Terminals are assigned to a primary store controller, and that controller is typically backed up by another controller. If the primary controller fails, the terminals automatically access the backup controller, providing uninterrupted sales at the POS terminal. If both the primary and backup controllers are unavailable, the terminal can go into a standalone state, or, some of the applications are able to support a Terminal Offline (TOF) state wherein terminals run offline using a terminal-based item file and logging stored in their own memory.

To maintain software at the store level, 4690 OS provides a software maintenance facility to manage updates. This facility provides checking to ensure that all updates have been transferred to the store, and the ability to apply the maintenance from store level commands or under central control. The updated software can be applied in test, which preserves the prior software in case the maintenance needs to be backed off for some reason.

4690 supports communications to the store controller in several forms. including TCP/IP, X.25, Systems Network Architecture (SNA), and asynchronous communications.

=== Commands ===
The following list of commands are supported by the 4690 Operating System.

- ASSIGN
- BACKUP
- BATCH
- BREAK
- BURNISO
- CHDIR
- CHKDSK
- CLS
- COMMAND
- COMP
- COPY
- DEFINE
- DIR
- DISKCOMP
- DISKCOPY
- ECHO
- ELSE
- ERASE
- EXIT
- FCOPY
- FIND
- FOR
- FORMAT
- FSET
- GOTO
- IF
- LIST
- MKDIR
- MORE
- ORDER
- PATH
- PAUSE
- PRINT
- PROMPT
- QUERY
- REM
- RENAME
- RESTORE
- RMDIR
- SECURITY
- SHIFT
- SORT
- SYS
- TREE
- TYPE
- UNLOCKP
- VER
- VERIFY
- VOL

== Technology and software ==
4690 OS was updated until 2020 to address the needs of its user community and in anticipation of upcoming requirements.

4690 Version 5 incorporated new security enhancements, such as Secure Shell (SSH), IPsec, and enhanced operator security (allowing alphanumeric operator IDs, password complexity requirements, password expiration, etc.). This has helped its users address new security requirements from the credit card companies.

Another recent addition to 4690 was the ability to forward store hardware- and software-level events to a Remote Management system to facilitate central control and monitoring. File integrity monitoring and lockdown of 4690s are becoming increasingly important due to recent breaches caused by point-of-sale malware based threats.

4690 supports applications written in a CBASIC variant named IBM 4680 BASIC, Metaware High-C, and Java 2. The Java language-based ability at both the server and the client, along with the extension of Internet protocol suite TCP/IP ability to the client, enables Java applications at both the server and client to run concurrently with extant CBASIC or C applications. Users can make functional enhancements to extant applications by developing a new Java application that communicates with an extant application.

== Versions ==
IBM 4690 Operating System versions:

- 1 (July 1993)
- 2 release 1
- 2 release 2
- 2 release 3
- 2 release 4
- 3 release 1
- 3 release 2
- 3 release 3
- 4 release 1
- 4 release 2
- 5 release 1
- 5 release 2
- 6 release 1
- 6 release 2
- 6 release 3 (May 2012)

Toshiba 4690 Operating System versions:

- 6 release 4 (January 2014)
- 6 release 5 Classic – Enhanced (January 2016)

== See also ==
- Digital Research
- Toshiba TCx Sky
- FlexOS
- IBM 4680 OS
- IBM 4683
- IBM 4693
- IBM 4694
- IBM 4695
- IMS REAL/32
- IBM Retail Environment for SUSE (IRES)
- Distributed Data Management Architecture (DDM)
