= IRES =

IRES may refer to:

- Internal ribosome entry site
- IBM Retail Environment for SUSE, a Point-of-Sale operating system solution
- Irish Residential Properties REIT
