= PRINT (command) =

Computing command

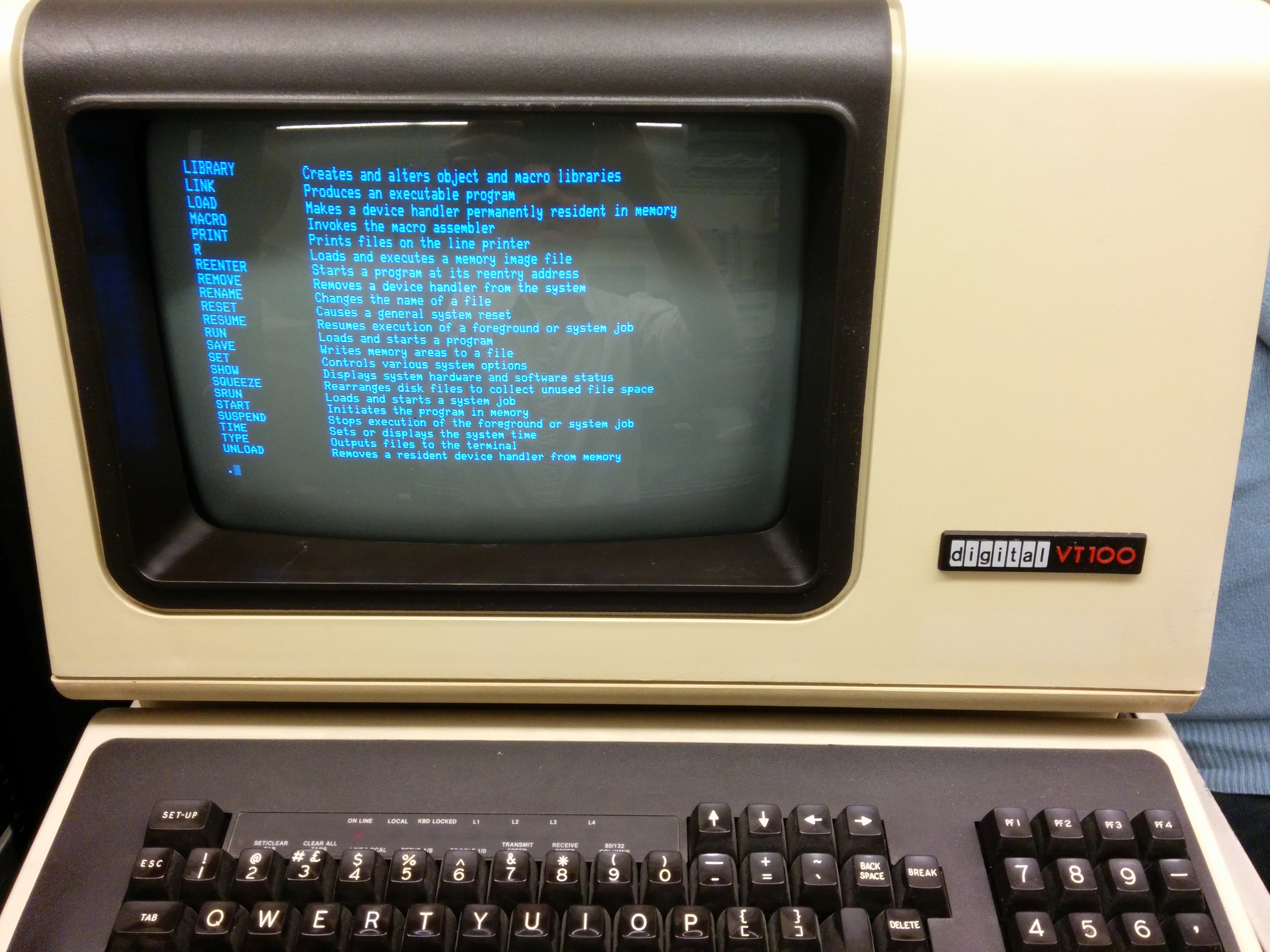
Description of the PRINT command of RT-11SJ displayed on a VT100.

In computing, the print command provides single-user print spooling capability in a number of operating systems. It is roughly similar to that provided by the UNIX System V lp and BSD lpr print spooler systems.

== Implementations ==
The command is available in the DEC RT-11, OS/8, RSX-11, TOPS-10, and TOPS-20 operating systems and also in DR FlexOS, DR DOS, TSL PC-MOS, Paragon Technology PTS-DOS, SISNE plus, IBM OS/2, eComStation, ArcaOS, Microsoft Windows, FreeDOS, Stratus OpenVOS, AROS, HP MPE/iX, and OpenVMS.

The FreeDOS version was developed by James Tabor and is licensed under the GPL.

== DOS, OS/2, Windows ==
=== Background ===
The command was introduced in MS-DOS/IBM PC DOS 2.0. DR DOS 6.0 includes an implementation of the PRINT command.

In early versions of DOS, printing was accomplished using the copy command: the file to be printed was "copied" to the file representing the print device. Control returned to the user when the print job completed. Beginning with DOS 2.0, the print command was included to allow basic print spooling: the ability to continue to use the computer while printing occurred in the background, and the ability to create a queue of jobs to be printed.

=== Description ===
The print command allowed specifying one of many possible local printer interfaces, and could make use of networked printers using the net command. A maximum number of files and a maximum buffer size could be specified, and further command-line options allowed adding and removing files from the queue. Margins, page lengths and number of copies could also be set, as well as a parameter to adjust between favoring printing speed versus computer responsiveness.

=== Retrospect ===
Users of the initial release of the print command commented on the slow print speed and high resource usage, as well as the lack of support for the newly introduced subdirectories. The command was among the first RAM-resident programs and was the first to achieve widespread use, with many users disassembling the binary in order to determine how RAM-resident programs should be written.

== See also ==
- List of DOS commands
- List of Unix commands
