= Z80-RIO =

- Developer: Zilog
- Working state: Discontinued
- Source model: Closed source
- Instruction sets: Zilog Z80
- Default user interface: Command-line interface
- License: Proprietary
- Official website: www.zilog.com

The Z80 Operating System with Relocatable Modules and I/O Management (Z80-RIO) is a general-purpose operating system developed by Zilog in the late 1970s for various computer systems including the Z80 Micro Computer System (MCZ-1) series and the Z80 Development System (ZDS). The MCZ systems were primarily used for software development and automation solutions. RIO was designed to facilitate the development and integration of user's programs into a production environment.

== Features ==
The system provides a modest environment with a minimum of system support and an enhanced environment.

The modest environment provides a program debugger with file manipulation capability, a floppy disk driver (supporting up to eight disk drives), and a basic console driver with provision for paper tape operation.

The enhanced environment provides access to the RIO Executive and to system support utilities such as the Zilog Floppy Disk File System (ZDOS), and the Zilog Hard Disk File System (DFS). It also provides access to a number of disk-resident software such a text editor, macro assembler, and linker.

=== Commands ===
The following list of commands are supported by Z80-RIO.

- ACTIVATE
- ALLOCATE
- ASM
- BRIEF
- CAT
- CLOSE
- COMPARE
- COPY
- COPY.DISK
- COPYSD
- DATE
- DEACTIVATE
- DEALLOCATE
- DEBUG
- DEFINE
- DELETE
- DISK.FORMAT
- DISK.REPAIR
- DISK.STATUS
- DISPLAY
- DO
- DUMP
- ECHO
- EDIT
- ERROR
- ERRORS
- EXTRACT
- FORCE
- FORMAT
- HELP
- IMAGE
- INITIALIZE
- LADT
- LINK
- MASTER
- MEMORY
- MOVE
- PAUSE
- RELEASE
- RENAME
- RESTORE_TABS
- SAVE_TABS
- SET
- STATUS
- VERBOSE
- XEQ

== Clones ==
UDOS, a Z80-RIO compatible clone by VEB Robotron, was available for a number of computers by the same company, such as the A 5120 or the PC 1715, which were based on the U880 processor (the latter being a clone of Zilog's Z80). UDOS was also one of the operating systems available for the P8000, a microcomputer system developed in 1987 by the VEB Elektro-Apparate-Werke Berlin-Treptow „Friedrich Ebert“ (EAW) in the German Democratic Republic (DDR, East Germany).

== See also ==
- Federico Faggin
- Ralph Ungermann
