= Help (command) =

Command in various command line shells

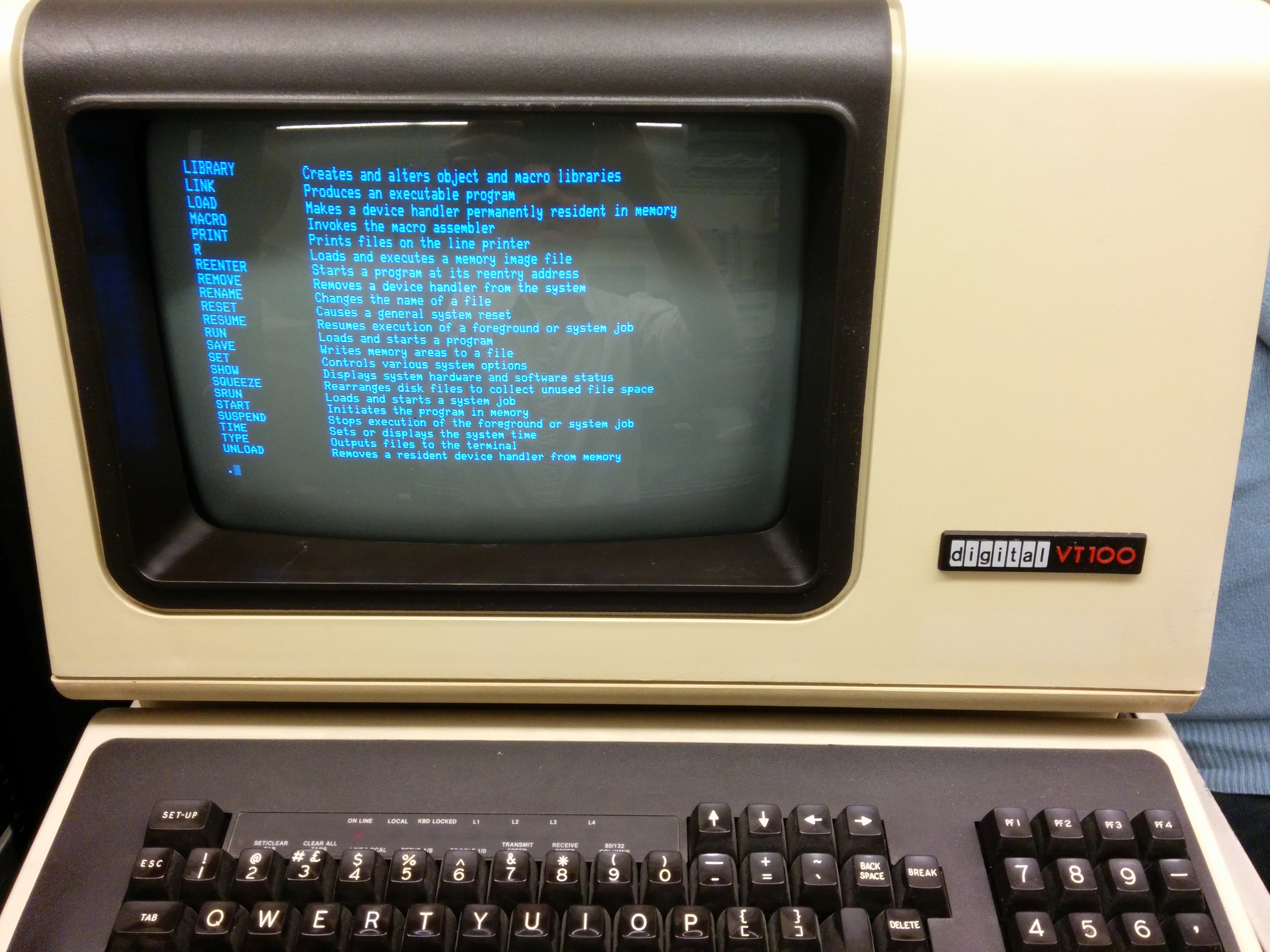
The end of the HELP command output from RT-11SJ displayed on a VT100.

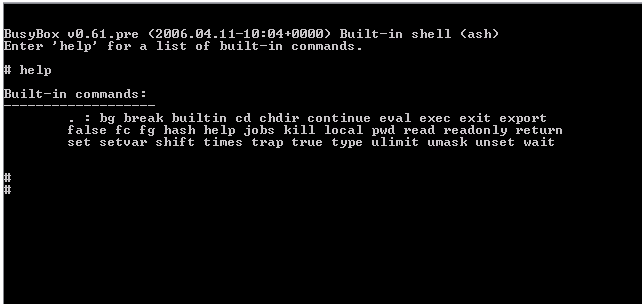
The BusyBox HELP command

In computing, help is a command in various command line shells such as COMMAND.COM, cmd.exe, Bash, qshell, 4DOS/4NT, Windows PowerShell, Singularity shell, Python, MATLAB and GNU Octave. It provides online information about available commands and the shell environment.

== Implementations ==
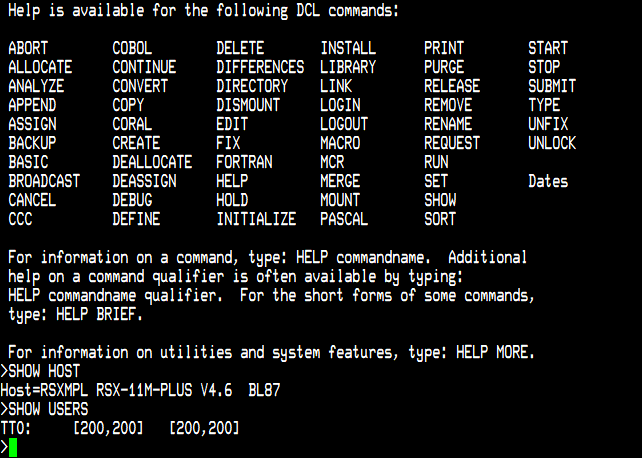
Information about the help command for DCL on RSX-11

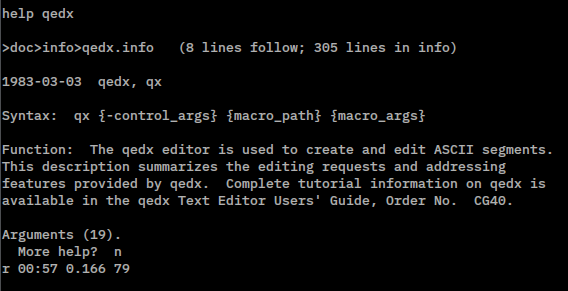
The help command for qedx on Multics

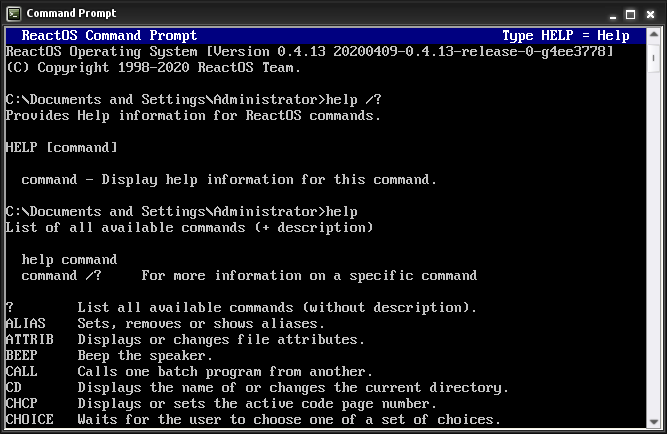
The ReactOS help command

The command is available in operating systems such as Multics, Heath Company HDOS, CP/M Plus, DOS, IBM OS/2, eComStation, ArcaOS, IBM i, Microsoft Windows, ReactOS, THEOS/OASIS, Zilog Z80-RIO, Microware OS-9, Stratus OpenVOS, HP MPE/iX, Motorola VERSAdos, KolibriOS and also in the DEC RT-11, RSX-11, TOPS-10 and TOPS-20 operating systems. Furthermore it is available in the open source MS-DOS emulator DOSBox and in the EFI shell.

On Unix, the command is part of the Source Code Control System and prints help information for the SCCS commands.

=== Multics ===
The Multics help command prints descriptions of system commands/active functions and subroutines. It also prints various information about the system status, system changes, and other general information. This information is selected from segments maintained online, which are in a special format, called information segments. More than 800 information segments are available.

=== DEC OS/8 ===
The DEC OS/8 CCL help command prints information on specified OS/8 programs.

=== DOS ===
==== MS-DOS ====
The help command is available in MS-DOS 5.x and later versions of the software. The help command with a 'command' parameter would give help on a specific command. If no arguments are provided, the command lists the contents of DOSHELP.HLP.

In MS-DOS 6.x this command exists as FASTHELP.

The MS-DOS 6.xx help command uses QBasic to view a quickhelp HELP.HLP file, which contains more extensive information on the commands, with some hyperlinking etc. The MS-DOS 6.22 help system is included on Windows 9x CD-ROM versions as well.

==== PC DOS ====
In PC DOS 5 and 6 help is the same form as MS-DOS 5 help command.

PC DOS 7.xx help uses view.exe to open OS/2 style INF files (cmdref.inf, dosrexx.inf and doserror.inf), opening these to the appropriate pages.

==== PC-MOS ====
The Software Link's PC-MOS includes an implementation of help. Like the rest of the operating system, it is licensed under the GPL v3.

==== DR-DOS ====
In DR-DOS, help is a batch file that launches DR-DOS' internal help program, dosbook.

==== ROM-DOS ====
Datalight ROM-DOS includes an implementation of the help command. ROM-DOS was introduced in 1989 as an MS-DOS compatible operating system designed for embedded systems.

==== FreeDOS ====
The FreeDOS version was developed by Joe Cosentino.

=== 4DOS/4NT ===
The 4DOS/4NT help command uses a text user interface to display the online help.

=== cmd.exe ===
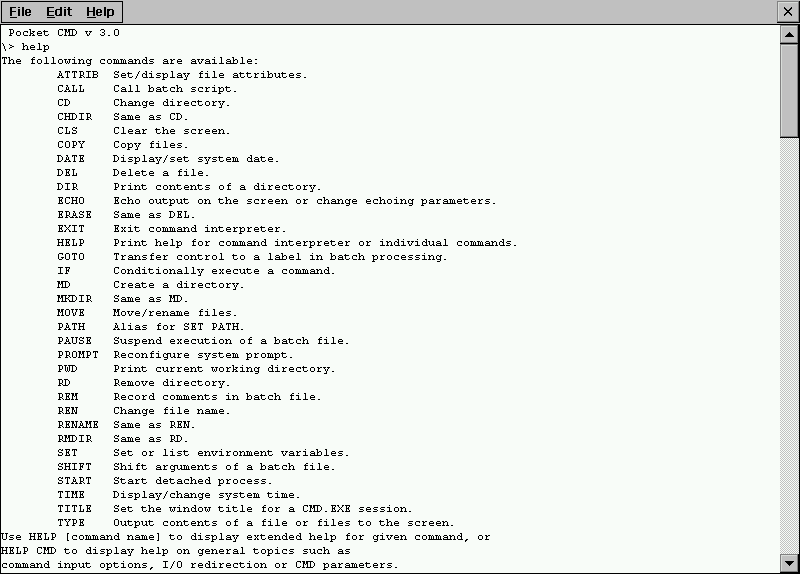
Pocket CMD v 3.0 (cmd.exe) on Windows CE 3.0 showing the help command output

Used without parameters, help lists and briefly describes every system command. Windows NT-based versions use MS-DOS 5 style help. Versions before Windows Vista also have a Windows help file (NTCMDS.HLP or NTCMDS.INF) in a similar style to MS-DOS 6.

=== PowerShell ===
In PowerShell, help is a short form (implemented as a PowerShell function) for access to the Get-Help Cmdlet.

Windows PowerShell includes an extensive, console-based help system, reminiscent of man pages in Unix. The help topics include help for cmdlets, providers, and concepts in PowerShell.

=== GNU Bash ===
In Bash, the builtin command help' lists all Bash builtin commands if used without arguments. Otherwise, it prints a brief summary of a command. Its syntax is:

help [-dms] [pattern]

=== OpenVMS ===
HELP is a DCL utility that contains information on the use of commands and descriptions of some OpenVMS concepts such as time formats and lexical functions, as well as lists of commands for a particular purpose (HELP Hints).

== Syntax ==
The command-syntax is:

help [command]

Arguments:

- command This command-line argument specifies the name of the command about which information is to be displayed.

== Examples ==
=== DOSBox ===
Z:\>help
If you want a list of all supported commands type help /all .
A short list of the most often used commands:
<DIR     > Directory View.
<CD      > Display/changes the current directory.
<CLS     > Clear screen.
<COPY    > Copy files.
...

=== Python ===
>>> help
Type help() for interactive help, or help(object) for help about object.
>>> help()

Welcome to Python 2.5!  This is the online help utility.

If this is your first time using Python, you should definitely check out
the tutorial on the Internet at https://www.python.org/doc/tut/.

Enter the name of any module, keyword, or topic to get help on writing
Python programs and using Python modules.  To quit this help utility and
return to the interpreter, just type "quit".
...

=== GNU Octave ===
octave-3.0.0.exe:1> help

Help is available for the topics listed below.
Additional help for built-in functions and operators is
available in the on-line version of the manual.  Use the command
`doc <topic>' to search the manual index.
...

== See also ==
- Online help
- List of DOS commands
