= PC-MOS/386 =

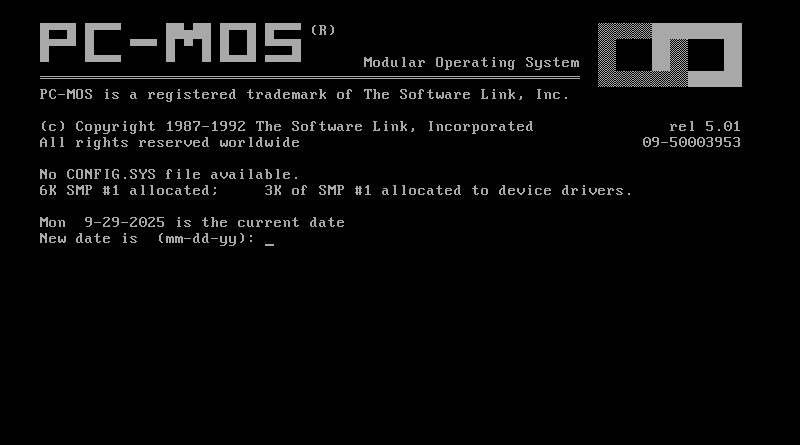
- A screen-print of the PC-MOS-386 startup screen
- Developer: The Software Link
- Written in: 80x86 assembly language, C
- OS family: DOS
- Working state: Active
- Source model: Open source, originally closed source
- Initial release: 1987; 39 years ago
- Latest release: 5.01
- Repository: github.com/roelandjansen/pcmos386v501
- Available in: English
- Supported platforms: x86 architecture
- Kernel type: Monolithic
- Influenced by: MS-DOS
- Default user interface: Command-line interface (COMMAND.COM)
- License: GPL-3.0-only, originally proprietary
- Official website: Github

PC-MOS/386 is a multi-user, multitasking computer operating system produced by The Software Link (TSL), announced at COMDEX in November 1986 for February 1987 release. PC-MOS/386, a successor to PC-MOS, can run many MS-DOS programs on the host machine or a terminal connected to it. Unlike MS-DOS, PC-MOS/386 is optimized for the Intel 80386 processor; however early versions will run on any x86 computer. PC-MOS/386 used to be proprietary, but it was released as open-source software in 2017.

== History ==
The last commercial version produced was v5.01, compatible with MS-DOS 5. It required a memory management unit (MMU) to support memory protection, so was not compatible with earlier 8086 and 8088 processors. MMU support for 286-class machines was provided using a proprietary hardware shim inserted between the processor and its socket. 386 machines did not require any special hardware.

Multi-user operation suffered from the limitations of the day including the inability of the processor to schedule and partition running processes. Typically swapping from a foreground to a background process on the same terminal used the keyboard to generate an interrupt and then swap the processes. The cost of RAM (over US$500/Mb in 1987) and the slow and expensive hard disks of the day limited performance.

PC-MOS used "dumb" terminals, referred to within MOS as 'workstations', connected to the machine running the operating system via serial ports communicating at 9600, 19200 or 38400 baud. Either dedicated terminals or computers running terminal emulation software could be used. All processing was done by the PC-MOS machine. Terminals running at higher speeds required specialized hardware boards which increased cost, but the speed was not a serious limitation for interacting with the text-based programs predominantly used under MS-DOS.

PC-MOS figured prominently in the lawsuit Arizona Retail Systems, Inc. v. The Software Link, Inc., where Arizona Retail Systems claimed The Software Link violated implied warranties on PC-MOS. The case is notable because The Software Link argued that it had disclaimed the implied warranties via a license agreement on the software's shrinkwrap licensing. The result of the case, which Arizona Retail Systems won, helped to establish US legal precedent regarding the enforceability of shrinkwrap licenses.

There was a year 2000 problem-like error in this operating system, first manifesting on 1 August 2012 rather than 1 January 2000; files created on the system after this date would no longer work.

On 21 July 2017 PCMOS/386 was relicensed under GPL v3 and its source code uploaded to GitHub, with the "year 2012" issue corrected.

== Commands ==
Commands supported by PC-MOS Version 4 are:

=== General commands ===
- ADDDEV
- ALIAS
- BREAK
- CD
- CLS
- COMMAND
- COMPFILE
- COPY
- DATE
- DIR
- DIRMAP
- DISKCOPY
- DISKID
- DOT
- ENVSIZE
- ERASE
- EXCEPT
- EXPORT
- FILEMODE
- FORMAT
- HELP
- IMPORT
- MD
- MORE
- MSORT
- MSYS
- ONLY
- PATH
- PROMPT
- RD
- REL
- REMDEV
- RENAME
- SEARCH
- SET
- SWITCH
- TIME
- TYPE
- VERIFY
- WVER

=== Batch file commands ===
- ABORT
- ADDTASK
- AUTOCD
- BATECHO
- CALL
- RETURN
- ECHO
- FLUSH
- FOR
- GOTO
- IF
- INSERT
- KEY
- NEXT
- PAUSE
- REM
- STOP
- SWITCH
- TEXT
- ENDTEXT

=== Multitask/Multiuser commands ===
- ADDTASK
- KEYMAP
- MOS
- MOSADM
- REMTASK

=== Print spooler ===
- PRINT
- SPOOL

=== Security commands ===
- CLASS
- SIGNOFF
- SIGNON

=== Installation, administration and debug commands ===
- DEBUG
- ED
- HDSETUP

== See also ==
- DoubleDOS
- Multiuser DOS - Digital Research's unrelated multi-user operating system
- VM/386 - unrelated multi-tasking DOS environment
- Virtual DOS machine
- Multiuser DOS Federation
- FreeDOS
- Timeline of operating systems
