= TOPS-10 =

Operating system for DEC PDP-10

- Developer: Digital Equipment Corporation
- Written in: MACRO-10, BLISS
- Working state: Discontinued
- Initial release: 1970; 56 years ago
- Latest release: 7.04 / July 1988; 38 years ago
- Available in: English
- Supported platforms: PDP-10
- Default user interface: CCL Command-line interface
- License: Proprietary; Free for personal use

TOPS-10 System (Timesharing / Total Operating System-10) is a discontinued operating system from Digital Equipment Corporation (DEC) for the PDP-10 (or DECsystem-10) mainframe computer family. Launched in 1967, TOPS-10 evolved from the earlier "Monitor" software for the PDP-6 and PDP-10 computers; this was renamed to TOPS-10 in 1970.

== Overview ==
The TOPS-10 operating system was designed to be primarily a time-sharing system, and supported "time sharing, remote batch processing, multiprogrammed batch, real-time, and multiprocessor configurations."

TOPS-10 supported shared memory and allowed the development of one of the first true multiplayer computer games. The game, called DECWAR, was a text-oriented Star Trek-type game. Users at terminals typed in commands and fought each other in real time. TOPS-10 was also the home of the original Multi User Dungeon, MUD, the forerunner to today's MMORPGs.

Another groundbreaking application was called FORUM. This application was perhaps the first so-called CB Simulator that allowed users to converse with one another in what is now known as a chat room. This application showed the potential of multi-user communication and led to the development of CompuServe's chat application.

TOPS-10 featured an application programming interface (API) that used a mechanism called a UUO or Unimplemented User Operation. UUOs implemented operating system calls in a way that made them look like machine instructions. The Monitor Call API allowed developers to use these operations, for system programming on DECsystem-10s..

The TOPS-10 scheduler supported prioritized run queues, and appended a process onto a queue depending on its priority. The system also included User file and Device independence.

=== Commands ===
The following list of commands are supported by TOPS-10.

- ASSIGN
- ATTACH
- BACKSPACE
- BACKUP
- CCONTINUE
- COMPILE
- CONTINUE
- COPY
- CORE
- CPUNCH
- CREATE
- CREDIR
- CREF
- CSTART
- D(eposit)
- DAYTIME
- DCORE
- DDT
- DEASSIGN
- DEBUG
- DELETE
- DETACH
- DIRECTORY
- DISABLE
- DISMOUNT
- DSK
- DUMP
- E(xamine)
- EDIT
- ENABLE
- EOF
- EXECUTE
- FILCOM
- FILE
- FINISH
- FUDGE
- GET
- GLOB
- HALT
- HELP
- INITIA
- JCONTINUE
- KJOB
- LABEL
- LIST
- LOAD
- LOCATE
- LOGIN
- MAKE
- MERGE
- MIC
- MOUNT
- NETWORK
- NODE
- NSAVE
- NSSAVE
- OPSER
- PJOB
- PLEASE
- PLOT
- PRESERVE
- PRINT
- PROTECT
- PUNCH
- QUEUE
- QUOLST
- R
- REASSIGN
- REATTACH
- REENTER
- RENAME
- RESOURCES
- REWIND
- RUN
- SAVE
- SSAVE
- SCHED
- SEND
- SET
- SKIP
- START
- SUBMIT
- SYSTAT
- TECO
- TIME
- TPUNCH
- TYPE
- UNLOAD
- USESTAT
- VERSION
- WHERE
- ZERO

== History ==
=== Release history ===
The PDP-6 Monitor software was first released in 1964. Support for the PDP-10's KA10 processor was added to the Monitor in release 2.18 in 1967. The TOPS-10 name was first used in 1970 for release 5.01. Release 6.01 (May 1974) was the first TOPS-10 to implement virtual memory (demand paging), enabling programs larger than physical memory to be run. From release 7.00 onwards, symmetrical multiprocessing was available (as opposed to the master/slave arrangement used before). The final release of TOPS-10 was 7.04 in 1988.

=== TOPS-10 today ===
Hobbyists are now entitled to set up and use TOPS-10 under a Hobbyist's License.

The easiest way for the hobbyist to run TOPS-10 is to acquire a suitable emulator and an operating system image. TOPS-10 may also be generated from archived original distribution "tapes".

Paul Allen maintained several publicly accessible historic computer systems, including a DECsystem-2065 running TOPS-10.

== Software ==
=== Implemented programming languages ===
The TOPS-10 assembler, MACRO-10, was bundled with the TOPS-10 distribution.

The following programming languages were implemented on TOPS-10 as layered products:

- ALGOL, as ALGOL-10 v10B, a compiler used for general computing
- APL, as APL-SF V2, an interpreter used for mathematical modelling
- BASIC, as BASIC-10 v17F, an interpreter used for general computing
- BLISS, as BLISS-10 and BLISS-36, compilers used for systems programming
- COBOL, as COBOL-68 and COBOL-74, compilers used for business computing
- Fortran, as FORTRAN-10 v11, a compiler used for numerical computing
- CPL (an interactive PL/I subset)

The following programming languages were implemented on TOPS-10 as contributions from DECUS members:

- FOCAL, as FOCAL-10
- Forth, a threaded interpreted language
- IMP72
- Lisp, an interpreter used for AI programming
- Pascal, a compiler used for computing education
- PILOT
- SAM76
- Simula, a compiler used for modeling
- SNOBOL, an interpreter used for string processing
- BCPL, a compiler implemented by Essex University

=== Implemented user utilities ===
The following major user utilities were implemented on TOPS-10:

- RMS (Records Management Services)
- IQL (Interactive Query language)
- DBMS-10 (CODASYL Database Management System)

=== Notable games implemented on TOPS-10 ===
- ADVENT
- DECWAR, as noted above
- FORUM, as noted above
- HAUNT, an early role-playing game
- Mac Hack, a chess program by Richard Greenblatt
- MUD

== Legacy ==
MS-DOS was heavily influenced by TOPS-10. Identical elements include three characters long file extensions, several standard extensions (e.g., EXE, TXT), the asterisk (*) as a wildcard, the usage of the slash (/) as a switch separator and more.

== TOPS-20 ==
Another DEC operating system for the PDP-10 was TOPS-20, which, despite its name, was almost entirely unrelated to TOPS-10. TOPS-20 supported TOPS-10 monitor calls thru an emulation facility which allowed most, but not all, TOPS-10 executables to run unchanged. TOPS-20 was not a direct followup to TOPS-10, and DEC support for both systems continued in parallel until the discontinuance of the PDP-10 line. TOPS-20 is a development of TENEX from BBN.

== See also ==
- PDP-10
- WAITS
