= Copy (command) =

Shell command for copying files

copy
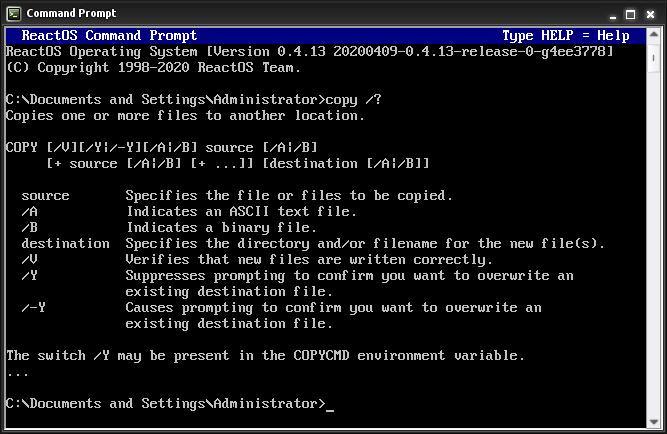
- The ReactOS copy command
- Developers: DEC, Intel, MetaComCo, Heath Company, Zilog, Microware, HP, Microsoft, IBM, DR, TSL, Datalight, Novell, Toshiba
- Written in: MS-DOS: x86 assembly language
- Operating system: RT-11, OS/8, RSX-11, ISIS-II, iRMX 86, TOPS-10, TOPS-20, OpenVMS, TRIPOS, HDOS, DOS, MSX-DOS, FlexOS, 4680 OS, 4690 OS, PC-MOS, Z80-RIO, OS-9, MPE/iX, OS/2, Windows, ReactOS, SymbOS, DexOS
- Type: Command
- License: HDOS: PD; MS-DOS: MIT; PC-MOS: GPL v3 ReactOS: GPL v2
- Repository: github.com/microsoft/MS-DOS/blob/main/v2.0/source/COPY.ASM

copy is a shell command for copying files.

Different implementations provide various capabilities, such as:

- Combining (concatenating) multiple files into a single file
- If multiple source files are specified before the path to an existing directory, then files are copied to the directory
- Support for text vs. binary data; for text, the command stops when it reaches an end-of-file (EOF) character; for binary, files are copied in their entirety, ignoring EOF
- In DOS, a file can be copied to or from a device. For example, copy path con outputs the file at path to the console, and copy con path copies text typed at the console to a file at path

== Implementations ==
The command is available in RT-11, OS/8, RSX-11, ISIS-II, iRMX 86, TOPS-10, TOPS-20, OpenVMS, MetaComCo TRIPOS, HDOS, Z80-RIO, OS-9, DOS, FlexOS, 4690 OS, PC-MOS, HP MPE/iX, OS/2, Windows, ROM-DOS, ReactOS, SymbOS, DexOS, and 86-DOS.

Under IBM PC DOS/MS-DOS the command is available since version 1.

Some shells provide a copy command with a different name. In Unix-based systems, the copy command is cp. In CP/M, the command is PIP. in OpenVOS, the command is copy_file.

== DOS ==
The following copies existing file fromfile to path tofile.

copy fromfile tofile

A file can be copied to a device. The following sends a file to the printer on lpt1.

copy letter.txt lpt1

The following outputs to stdout, like the type command.

copy letter.txt con

The following concatenates the page# files into book.txt – like cat.

copy page1.txt+page2.txt book.txt

The command can copy files between drives.

The following uses text mode to copy text of the file, stopping when it reaches an EOF character.

copy /a doc1.txt + doc2.txt doc3.txt
copy /a *.txt doc3.txt

The following uses binary mode, concatenating files in their entirety and ignoring EOF characters.

copy /b image1.jpg + image2.jpg image3.jpg

== See also ==
- XCOPY – Shell command for copying files
