= Diskcopy =

Command that makes a copy of a diskette

diskcopy
- Original author: Chris Peters
- Developers: Microsoft, IBM, Digital Research, Datalight, Novell, Toshiba, MetaComCo, Processor Technology, TSL, Imre Leber
- Release: 1982, 43–44 years ago
- Written in: MS-DOS: x86 assembly language
- Operating system: MS-DOS, PC DOS, FlexOS, DR DOS, 4690 OS, TRIPOS, PTDOS, AmigaDOS, PC-MOS, ROM-DOS, PTS-DOS, SISNE plus, FreeDOS, OS/2, eComStation, ArcaOS, Windows
- Platform: Cross-platform
- Type: Command
- License: MS-DOS: MIT; FreeDOS: GNU GPL 2 PC-MOS: GNU GPL 3
- Repository: github.com/microsoft/MS-DOS/blob/main/v2.0/source/DISKCOPY.ASM

In computing, diskcopy is a command used on a number of operating systems for copying the complete contents of a diskette to another diskette.

== Implementations ==
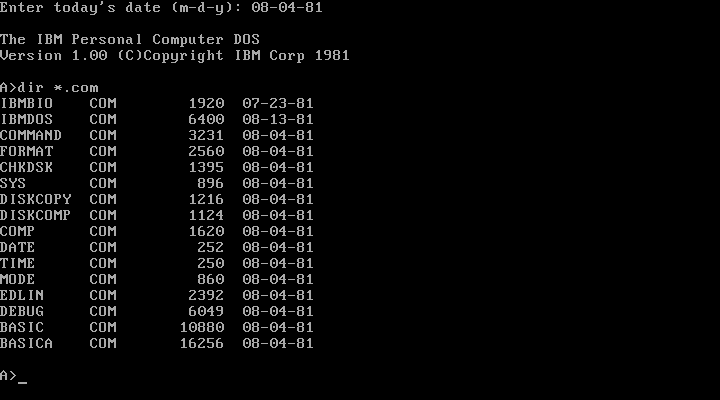
DISKCOPY.COM (among other commands) in IBM PC DOS 1.0.

The command is available in MS-DOS, IBM PC DOS, DR FlexOS, IBM/Toshiba 4690 OS, MetaComCo TRIPOS, Processor Technology PTDOS, AmigaDOS, TSL PC-MOS, PTS-DOS, SISNE plus, FreeDOS, IBM OS/2, and Microsoft Windows.

The MS-DOS version was originally written in August 1982. It is available in MS-DOS versions 2 and later. Digital Research DR DOS 6.0 and Datalight ROM-DOS also include an implementation of the diskcopy command. The FreeDOS version was developed by Imre Leber and is licensed under the GNU GPL 2.

The command is not included in Windows 10.

The command is not included in Windows 11. xcopy is a like command

== Example ==
- Copy the complete contents of the diskette in Drive A drive to the diskette in B drive.

>diskcopy a: b:

- If there is only have one diskette drive, diskcopy can be done by typing the source drive only. The disk copy program will prompt to insert the second (target) diskette once it finishes reading the complete contents of the first (source) diskette track by track into memory.

>diskcopy a:

- If only the first side of the diskette needs to be copied, even if the target diskette is double sided, the /1 switch can be used.

>diskcopy a: /1

- To make sure the contents are written reliably, the /V switch can be used, but it will cost more time to copy.

>diskcopy a: /V

- Force diskcopy to use only the conventional memory for temporary storage:

>diskcopy a: /M

== Limitation ==
Diskcopy does not work with hard disk drives, CDs, network drives, Zip drives, or USB drives, etc. It also does not allow diskcopy from 3.5 inch drive to 5.25 inch drives, and vice versa. The source and target drive must be the same size.
