= IBM Retail Store Solutions =

Defunct business unit within IBM

IBM Retail Store Solutions was IBM's division in the retail market segment. During its run, IBM Retail Store Solutions had several product lines, both hardware and software. Hardware products included IBM SurePOS 700 point-of-sale systems or printers. Software products under its portfolio included IBM 4690, IRES (IBM Retail Environment for SUSE LINUX), Lotus Expeditor, Lotus Expeditor Integrator, IBM Store Integrator, IBM Store Integrator Graphic User Interface. Besides those, IBM RSS was responsible for the creation of software such as the 4690 software, IRES. and POSS for DOS. IBM won the 2008 Point of Sale Green Excellence of the Year award. On April 17, 2012, IBM announced a definitive agreement under which Toshiba TEC acquired IBM's Retail Store Solutions business.

== IBM IRES ==
IBM IRES (IBM Retail Environment for SUSE LINUX) retail functions such as those provided by IBM's 4690 features, including Server-based POS loading and booting, Industry-standard system-wide configuration and change management, Automatic problem determination with single-step dump button support, Combined server/terminal support, Client preload GUI and Remote Management Agent for systems management support. It is also one of the platforms that support WebSphere MQ platform as part of the IBM Store Integration Framework.

IBM IRES made a partnership with 360Commerce via the 2005 PartnerWorld Beacon Award for IRES Solutions. IBM IRES is also used with Triversity's Transactionware Enterprise and, it is the first Java POS solution designed from the ground up to harness the power of J2EE in retail.

IRES has an IBM IRES Sales Mastery course and exam which can be found online.

== IBM POSS for DOS ==
IBM POSS (Point of Sale Subsystem for DOS) is a legacy software that functions with IBM PC DOS and enables many IBM customers from the 1980s. The latest publicly supported version is 2.2.0.
