= RT-11 =

Real-time operating system

- Screenshot of RT-11XM booting on a PDP-11/73B
- Developer: Digital Equipment Corporation and Mentec, Inc.
- Written in: MACRO-11
- Working state: Discontinued
- Source model: Closed source, Source-available
- Initial release: June 1973; 53 years ago
- Latest release: 5.7 / October 1998; 28 years ago
- Marketing target: Laboratory, scientific, industrial equipment
- Available in: English
- Supported platforms: PDP-11 family and clones
- Kernel type: Monolithic
- Default user interface: Keyboard Monitor (KMON) Command-line interface
- License: Proprietary

RT-11 (Real-time 11) is a discontinued small, low-end, single-user real-time operating system for the full line of Digital Equipment Corporation PDP-11 16-bit computers. First released in June 1973, it was widely used for real-time computing systems, process control, and data acquisition across all PDP-11s, as well as low-cost general-use computing.

Written in MACRO-11 assembly language, RT-11 featured a compact footprint capable of running in minimal memory, loadable device drivers, and a contiguous file system using RADIX-50 encoding. Digital Equipment Corporation offered several monitor variants ranging from single-job (SJ) to foreground/background (FB) and extended memory (XM) configurations, while third-party extensions such as TSX-11 and SHAREplus added multi-user capabilities. RT-11 remained in active use into the 1990s under Mentec and inspired several clones in the Soviet Union.

== History ==
Digital Equipment Corporation (DEC) released the first version of RT-11 in June 1973 for the PDP-11 family of 16-bit minicomputers. Designed as a lightweight, single-user operating system with rapid interrupt response, RT-11 filled a distinct niche alongside DEC's larger multi-user, time-sharing systems such as RSX-11M and RSTS/E. While Unix also gained popularity on PDP-11 hardware, RT-11 remained the preferred platform for laboratory instrumentation, industrial process control, and real-time data acquisition where deterministic response times and minimal memory overhead were required.

Throughout the 1970s and 1980s, DEC expanded RT-11 across five major releases (V1 through V5). Early versions focused on single-job operation (`RT-11SJ`) on unmapped 16-bit systems, whereas later releases introduced foreground/background multitasking (`RT-11FB`), support for hardware memory management beyond 64 KB (`RT-11XM`), separate instruction and data space (`RT-11ZM`), and loadable system device drivers starting with Version 4.0. Because DEC documented the operating system's internals and fostered third-party hardware integration through the Digital Equipment Computer Users Society (DECUS), RT-11 became widely adopted in scientific and industrial settings.

In the 1990s, Mentec acquired licensing and development rights for DEC's PDP-11 operating systems, releasing the final official version, RT-11 V5.7, in October 1998. Mentec later released a personal-use, non-commercial license allowing hobbyists and enthusiasts to run RT-11 and other DEC PDP-11 operating systems on historical hardware and emulators such as SIMH.

== Architecture and features ==
RT-11 was designed around a compact, monolithic kernel written in MACRO-11 assembly language to deliver deterministic real-time performance on modest hardware. Rather than implementing preemptive time-sharing or complex virtual memory overhead, the operating system gave running programs direct, low-latency access to hardware interrupts and peripherals while keeping memory residency minimal. Users could tailor the kernel, job capacity, and device support to match specific PDP-11 configurations through a modular system generation process.

=== Source code ===
RT-11 was written in assembly language. Heavy use of the conditional assembly and macro programming features of the MACRO-11 assembler allowed a significant degree of configurability and allowed programmers to specify high-level instructions otherwise unprovided for in machine code. RT-11 distributions included the source code of the operating system and its device drivers with all the comments removed and a program named "SYSGEN" which would build the operating system and drivers according to a user-specified configuration. Developer's documentation included a kernel listing that included comments.

=== Device drivers ===
In RT-11, device drivers were loadable, except that prior to V4.0 the device driver for the system device (boot device) was built into the kernel at configuration time. Because RT-11 was commonly used for device control and data acquisition, it was common for developers to write or enhance device drivers. DEC encouraged such driver development by making their hardware subsystems (from bus structure to code) open, documenting the internals of the operating system, encouraging third-party hardware and software vendors, and by fostering the development of the Digital Equipment Computer Users Society.

=== Multitasking ===
RT-11 systems did not support preemptive multitasking, but most versions could run multiple simultaneous applications. All variants of the monitors provided a background job. The FB, XM, and ZM monitors also provided a foreground job, and six system jobs if selected via the SYSGEN system generation program. These tasks had fixed priorities, with the background job lowest and the foreground job highest. It was possible to switch between jobs from the system console user interface, and SYSGEN could generate a monitor that provided a single background job (the SB, XB and ZB variants). The terms foreground and background are counterintuitive; the background job was typically the user's command-line interpreter; a foreground job might be doing something like non-interactive data collection.

=== Human interface ===
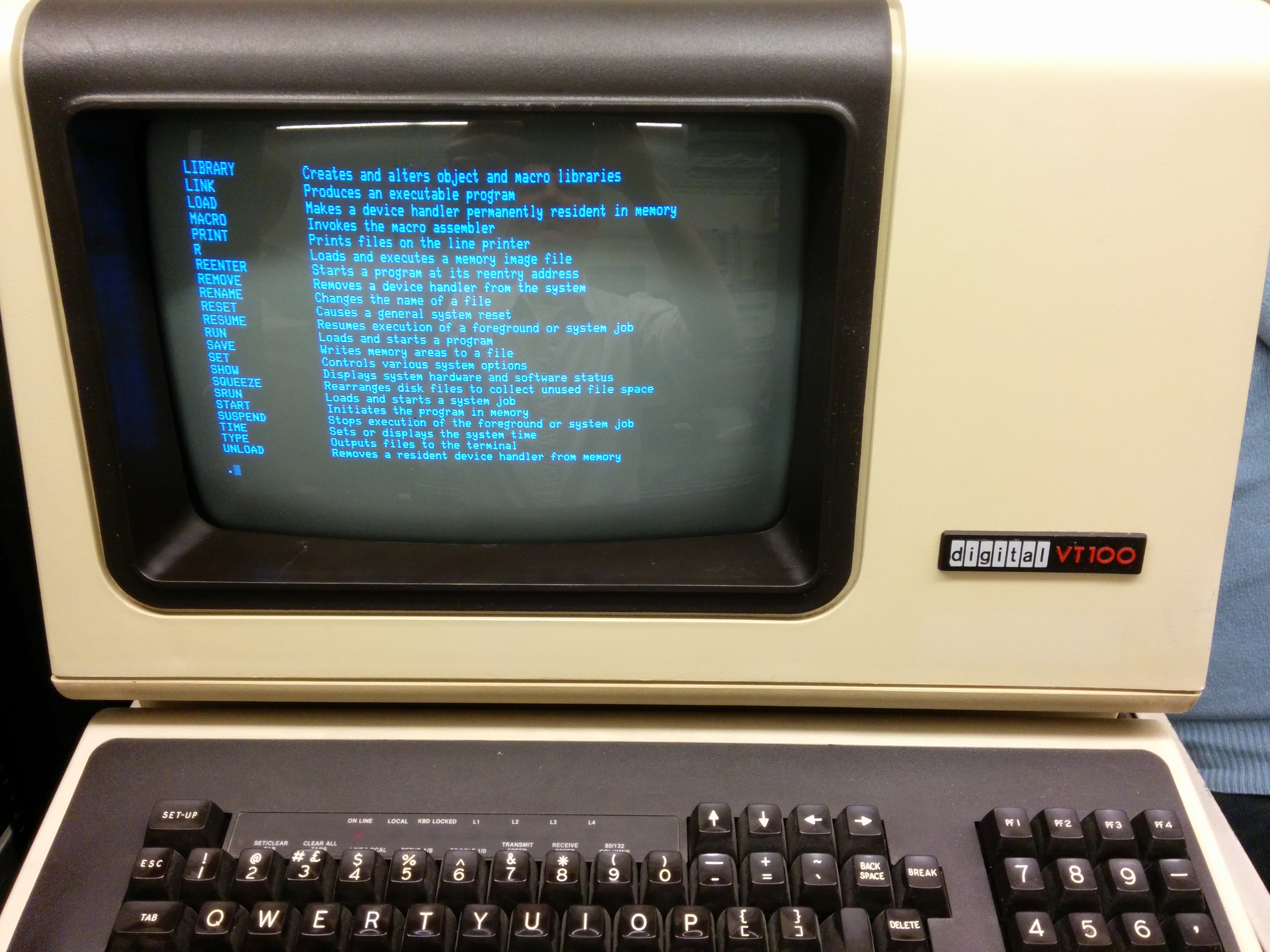
The end of the HELP command output from RT-11SJ displayed on a VT100.

Users generally operated RT-11 via a printing terminal or a video terminal, originally via a strap-selectable current-loop (for conventional teletypes) or via an RS-232 (later RS-422 as well) interface on one of the CPU cards; DEC also supported the VT11 and VS60 graphics display devices (vector graphics terminals with a graphic character generator for displaying text, and a light pen for graphical input). A third-party favorite was the Tektronix 4010 family.

The Keyboard Monitor (KMON) interpreted commands issued by the user and would invoke various utilities with Command String Interpreter (CSI) forms of the commands. RT-11 command language had many features (such as commands and device names) that can be found later in the DOS line of operating systems which heavily borrowed from RT-11. The CSI form expected input and output filenames and options ('switches' on RT-11) in a precise order and syntax. The command-line switches were separated by a slash (/) rather than the dash (-) used in Unix-like operating systems. All commands had a full form and a short one to which they could be contracted. For example, the RENAME command could be contracted to REN.

Batch files and the batch processor could be used to issue a series of commands with some rudimentary control flow. Batch files had the extension .BAT.

In later releases of RT-11, it was possible to invoke a series of commands using a .COM command file, but they would be executed in sequence with no flow control. Even later, it was possible to execute a series of commands with great control through use of the Indirect Command File Processor (IND), which took .CMD control files as input.

Files with the extension .SAV were a sort of executable. They were known as "save files" because the RT-11 SAVE command could be used to save the contents of memory to a disk file which could be loaded and executed at a later time, allowing any session to be saved.

The SAVE command, along with GET, START, REENTER, EXAMINE and DEPOSIT were basic commands implemented in the KMON. Some commands and utilities were later borrowed in the DOS line of operating systems. These commands include DIR, COPY, RENAME, ASSIGN, CLS, DELETE, TYPE, HELP and others. The FORMAT command was used for physical disk formatting, although it was not capable of creating a file system, for which purpose the INIT command was used (analogue of DOS command FORMAT /Q). Most commands supported using wildcards in file names.

Physical device names were specified in the form 'dd{n}:' where 'dd' was a two-character alphabetic device name and the optional 'n' was the unit number (0–7). When the unit number was omitted, unit 0 was assumed. For example, TT: referred to the console terminal, LP: (or LP0:) referred to the parallel line printer, and DX0:, DY1:, DL4: referred to disk volumes (RX01 unit 0, RX02 unit 1, RL01 or RL02 unit 4, respectively). Logical device names consisted of 1–3 alphanumeric characters and were used in the place of a physical device name. This was accomplished using the ASSIGN command. For example, one might issue ASSIGN DL0 ABC which would cause all future references to 'ABC:' to map to 'DL0:'. Reserved logical name DK: referred to the current default device. If a device was not included in a file specification, DK: was assumed. Reserved logical name SY: referred to the system device (the device from which the system had been booted).

Later versions of RT-11 allowed specification of up to 64 units (0–77 octal) for certain devices, but the device name was still limited to three alphanumeric characters. This feature was enabled through a SYSGEN selection, and only applied to the DU and LD device handlers. In these two cases, the device name form became 'dnn:' where 'd' was 'D' for the DU device and 'L' for the LD device, and 'nn' was 00–77(octal).

=== Software ===
RT-11 was distributed with utilities for performing many actions. The utilities DIR, DUP, PIP and FORMAT were for managing disk volumes. TECO, EDIT, and the visual editors KED (for the DEC VT100) and K52 (for the DEC VT52) were used to create and edit source and data files. MACRO, LINK, and LIBR were for building executables. ODT, VDT and the SD device were used to debug programs. DEC's version of Runoff was for producing documents. Finally, VTCOM was used to connect with and use (or transfer files to and from) another computer system over the phone via a modem.

The system was complete enough to handle many modern personal computing tasks. Productivity software such as LEX-11, a word processing package, and a spreadsheet from Saturn Software, used under other PDP-11 operating systems, also ran on RT-11. Large amounts of free, user-contributed software for RT-11 were available from the Digital Equipment Computer Users Society (DECUS) including an implementation of C. Although the tools to develop and debug assembly-language programs were provided, other languages including C, Fortran, Pascal, and several versions of BASIC were available from DEC as "layered products" at extra cost. Versions of these and other programming languages were also available from other, third-party, sources. It is even possible to network RT-11 machines using DECNET, the Internet and protocols developed by other, third-party sources.

=== Distributions and minimal system configuration ===
The RT-11 operating system could be booted from, and perform useful work on, a machine consisting of two 8-inch 250 KB floppy disks and 56 KB of memory, and could support 8 terminals. Other boot options include the RK05 2.5 MB removable hard disk platter, or magnetic tape. Distributions were available pre-installed or on punched tape, magnetic tape, cartridge tape, or floppy disk. A minimal but complete system supporting a single real-time user could run on a single floppy disk and in 8K 16-bit words (16 KB) of RAM, including user programs. This was facilitated by support for swapping and overlaying. To realize operation on such small memory system, the keyboard command user interface would be swapped out during the execution of a user's program and then swapped into memory upon program termination. The system supported a real-time clock, printing terminal, VT11 vector graphic unit, 16 channel 100 kHz A/D converter with 2 channel D/A, 9600 baud serial port, 16 bit bidirectional boards, etc.

=== File system ===
RT-11 implemented a simple and fast file system employing six-character filenames with three-character extensions (6.3) encoded in RADIX-50, which packed those nine characters into only three 16-bit words (six bytes). This resulted in allowable filename characters being 'A'-'Z', 'a'-'z' forced to upper case, '0'-'9', '$', '%', '*'. Filenames could be prefixed by a device name to specify a device different to the default DK: device, also encoded in RADIX-50.

All files were contiguous, meaning that each file occupied consecutive blocks (the minimally addressable unit of disk storage, 512 bytes) on the disk. This meant that an entire file could be read (or written) very quickly. A side effect of this file system structure was that, as files were created and deleted on a volume over time, the unused disk blocks would likely not remain contiguous, which could become the limiting factor in creating large files; the remedy was to periodically "squeeze" (or "squish") a disk to consolidate the unused portions.

Each volume has only one directory which was preallocated at the beginning of the volume. The directory consists of an array of entries, one per file or unallocated space. Each directory entry is 8 (or more) 16-bit words, though a sysgen option allowed extra application-specific storage.

=== Compatibility with other DEC operating systems ===
Many RT-11 programs (those that did not need specialized peripherals or direct access to the hardware) could be directly executed using the RT-11 RTS (Run-time system) of the RSTS/E timesharing system or under RTEM (RT Emulator) on various releases of both RSX-11 and VMS.

The implementation of DCL for RT-11 increased its compatibility with the other DEC operating systems. Although each operating system had commands and options which were unique to that operating system, there were a number of commands and command options which were common.

== Hardware ==
RT-11 ran on all members of the DEC PDP-11 family, both Q-Bus- and Unibus-based. In addition, it ran on the Professional Series and the PDT-11 "Programmed Data Terminal" systems, also from DEC. Since the PDP-11 architecture was implemented in replacement products by other companies (e.g., the M100 and family from Mentec), or as reverse-engineered clones in other countries (e.g., the DVK from the Soviet Union), RT-11 runs on these machines as well.

== Peripherals ==
Adding driver support for peripherals such as a CalComp plotter typically involved copying files, and did not require a SYSGEN.

== Compatible operating systems ==
=== Fuzzball ===
Fuzzball, routing software for Internet Protocols, was capable of running RT-11 programs.

=== SHAREplus ===
HAMMONDsoftware (of Göttingen, West Germany) developed RT-11-related systems including the STAR-eleven multi-computer environment and SHAREplus, a multi-user, multi-process extension booting over RT-11 with concepts inspired by VAX/VMS. It required RT-11 device drivers, offered optional network support for transparent file and device sharing with PDP-11s and VAX/VMS systems, provided limited RSX-11 compatibility, and maintained its primary user base in Europe.

=== TSX-11 ===
TSX-11, developed by S&H Computing, was a multi-user, multi-processing implementation of RT-11. The only thing it did not do was handle the boot process, so any TSX-Plus machine was required to boot RT-11 first before running TSX-Plus as a user program. Once TSX-Plus was running, it would take over complete control of the machine from RT-11. It provided true memory protection for users from other users, provided user accounts and maintained account separation on disk volumes and implemented a superset of the RT-11 EMT programmed requests.

S&H wrote the original TSX because "Spending $25K on a computer that could only support one user bugged [founder Harry Sanders]"; the outcome was the initial four-user TSX in 1976. TSX-Plus (released in 1980) was the successor to TSX, released in 1976. The system was popular in the 1980s. RT-11 programs generally ran, unmodified, under TSX-Plus and, in fact, most of the RT-11 utilities were used as-is under TSX-Plus. Device drivers generally required only slight modifications.

Depending on which PDP-11 model and the amount of memory, the system could support a minimum of 12 users (14–18 users on a 2 MB 11/73, depending on workload). The last version of TSX-Plus had TCP/IP support.

== Versions ==
=== Variants ===
Users could choose from variants with differing levels of support for multitasking, memory size, and separate I & D (Instruction and Data) address space. There are special variants of the monitor that are only used to boot distribution media during installation. RT-11AI is the automatic installation monitor for most PDP-11 models; RT11-PI is the automatic installation monitor for the Professional 300 series.

==== Unmapped memory ====
- RT-11SJ (Single Job) allowed only one task. This was the initial distribution. Later versions refer to RT-11SB.
- RT-11BL (Base-line) a stripped-down version of SJ that has minimal memory residency and lacks optional features.
- RT-11FB (Foreground/Background) supported two tasks: a high-priority, non-interactive "Foreground" job, and a low-priority, interactive "Background" job.

==== Mapped memory ====
- RT-11XB single job, does not support I & D separation.
- RT-11XM (eXtended Memory), a superset of FB, provided support for memory beyond 64 KB, but required a minicomputer with memory management hardware; distributed from approx. 1975-on. Up to 8 concurrent jobs.
- RT-11ZB single job, supports I & D separation.
- RT-11ZM provided support for systems with Separate Instruction and Data space (such as on the Unibus-based 11/44, 45, 55, 70, 84, and 94 and the Q-Bus-based 11/53, 73, 83, and 93.) Up to 8 concurrent jobs.

=== Specialized versions ===
Several specialized PDP-11 systems were sold based on RT-11:

- LAB-11 provided an LPS-11 analog peripheral for the collection of laboratory data
- PEAK-11 provided further customization for use with gas chromatographs (analyzing the peaks produced by the GC); data collection ran in RT-11's foreground process while the user's data analysis programs ran in the background.
- GT4x systems added a VT11 vector graphics peripheral. Several very popular demo programs were provided with these systems including Lunar Lander and a version of Spacewar!.
- GT62 systems added a VS60 vector graphics peripheral (VT11-compatible) in a credenza cabinet.
- GAMMA-11 was a packaged RT-11 and PDP 11/34 system that was one of the first fully integrated Nuclear Medicine systems. It included fast analog/digital converters, 16 bit colour graphical displays, and an extensive software library for development of applications for the purpose of data collection, analysis and display from a nuclear medicine gamma camera.

=== Clones in the USSR ===
Because the PDP-11 architecture was widely cloned in the Soviet Union, several localized and adapted versions of RT-11 were developed for Soviet minicomputers and microcomputers:

- RAFOS (РАФОС) – adapted for SM EVM minicomputers.
- FOBOS (ФОБОС) – adapted for the Elektronika 60 microcomputer.
- FODOS (ФОДОС) – disk operating system variant for Soviet PDP-11-compatible systems.
- RUDOS (РУДОС) – Russian-localized RT-11 derivative.
- OS DVK (ОС ДВК) – developed for the DVK personal computer series.
- OS BK-11 (ОС БК-11) – adapted for the Elektronika BK-0011 educational and home computer.
- MASTER-11 (МАСТЕР-11) – enhanced RT-11-compatible environment for DVK systems.
- NEMIGA OS (НЕМИГА) – developed for the Nemiga PK 588 educational computer.

== See also ==
- TSX-32
