= List of Toshiba subsidiaries =

Subsidiaries of Toshiba. Together, these companies form the Toshiba Group.

== Subsidiaries ==
As of April 2020, Toshiba is organized into six groupings as follows:

- Electronic Devices & Storage Solutions
  - Toshiba Electronic Devices & Storage Corporation
    - Semiconductor Division
    - Storage Products Division (HDD)
    - Research & Develop Center
- Building Solutions
  - Toshiba Elevator & Building Systems Corporation
  - Toshiba Lighting & Technology Corporation
- Energy Systems & Solutions
  - Toshiba Plant Systems & Services Corporation (combined-cycle gas power plants, nuclear power plants, hydro-electric power plants, and associated components)
  - Toshiba Energy Systems & Solutions Corporation (energy-related solutions, including energy transmission and distribution, heavy ion therapy solutions)
- Infrastructure Systems & Solutions
  - Toshiba Infrastructure Systems & Solutions Corporation
    - Railway & Automotive Systems Division
    - Railway Systems Division
    - Automotive Systems Division
    - Motor & Drive Systems Division
    - Automation Products & Facility Solution Division
    - Defense & Electronic Systems Division
    - Environmental Systems Division
- Digital Solutions
  - Toshiba Digital Solutions Corporation

- Retail & Printing Solutions
  - Toshiba Tec Corporation (publicly listed; 50 percent stake is owned by Toshiba)
    - Toshiba TEC Solution Service Corporation.
    - Toshiba TEC Europe Retail Information Systems S.A.
    - Toshiba TEC Germany Imaging Systems GmbH
    - Toshiba Global Commerce Solutions Holdings Corporation

== Affiliates and joint ventures ==
- TMEIC (joint venture with Mitsubishi Electric)

== Former subsidiaries and affiliates ==
- Toshiba EMI
- Westinghouse Electric Company
- Landis+Gyr
- Toshiba Logistics Corporation
- Dynabook Inc.
- Toshiba Memory Holding Corporation
- Toshiba Carrier Corporation
