= Timeline of operating systems =

This article presents a timeline of events in the history of computer operating systems from 1949 to the current day. For a narrative explaining the overall developments, see the History of operating systems.

== 20th Century ==
=== 1940s ===
- 1949
  - EDSAC

=== 1950s ===
- 1951
  - LEO I
- 1953
  - DYSEAC
- 1955
  - General Motors Operating System made for IBM 701
  - MIT's Tape Director operating system made for UNIVAC 1103
- 1956
  - GM-NAA I/O for IBM 704, based on General Motors Operating System
- 1957
  - Atlas Supervisor (Manchester University) (Atlas computer project start)
  - BESYS (Bell Labs), for IBM 704, later IBM 7090 and IBM 7094
- 1958
  - University of Michigan Executive System (UMES), for IBM 704, 709, and 7090
- 1959
  - SHARE Operating System (SOS), based on GM-NAA I/O

=== 1960s ===
- 1960
  - IBSYS (IBM for its 7090 and 7094)
- 1961
  - CTSS demonstration (MIT's Compatible Time-Sharing System for the IBM 7094)
  - MCP (Burroughs Master Control Program) for B5000
- 1962
  - Atlas Supervisor (Manchester University) (Atlas computer commissioned)
  - BBN Time-Sharing System
  - GCOS (GE's General Comprehensive Operating System, originally GECOS, General Electric Comprehensive Operating Supervisor)
- 1963
  - ADMIRAL
  - AN/FSQ-32, another early time-sharing system begun
  - CTSS becomes operational (MIT's Compatible Time-Sharing System for the IBM 7094)
  - JOSS, an interactive time-shared system that did not distinguish between operating system and language
  - Titan Supervisor, early time-sharing system begun
- 1964
  - Berkeley Timesharing System (for Scientific Data Systems' SDS 940)
  - Chippewa Operating System (for CDC 6600 supercomputer)
  - Dartmouth Time-Sharing System (Dartmouth College's DTSS for GE computers)
  - EXEC 8 (UNIVAC)
  - KDF9 Timesharing Director (English Electric) – an early, fully hardware secured, fully pre-emptive process switching, multi-programming operating system for KDF9 (originally announced in 1960)
  - OS/360 (IBM's primary OS for its S/360 series) (announced)
  - PDP-6 Monitor (DEC) descendant renamed TOPS-10 in 1970
  - SCOPE (CDC 3000 series)
- 1965
  - BOS/360 (IBM's Basic Operating System)
  - DECsys
  - TOS/360 (IBM's Tape Operating System)
  - Livermore Time Sharing System (LTSS)
  - Multics (MIT, GE, Bell Labs for the GE-645) (announced)
  - Pick operating system
  - SIPROS 66 (Simultaneous Processing Operating System)
  - THE multiprogramming system (Technische Hogeschool Eindhoven) development
  - TSOS (later VMOS) (RCA)
- 1966
  - DOS/360 (IBM's Disk Operating System)
  - GEORGE 1 & 2 for ICT 1900 series
  - Mod 1
  - Mod 2
  - Mod 8
  - MS/8 (Richard F. Lary's DEC PDP-8 system)
  - MSOS (Mass Storage Operating System)
  - OS/360 (IBM's primary OS for its S/360 series) PCP and MFT (shipped)
  - RAX
  - Remote Users of Shared Hardware (RUSH), a time-sharing system developed by Allen-Babcock for the IBM 360/50
  - SODA for Elwro's Odra 1204
  - Universal Time-Sharing System (XDS Sigma series)
- 1967
  - CP-40, predecessor to CP-67 on modified IBM System/360 Model 40
  - CP-67 (IBM, also known as CP/CMS)
  - Conversational Programming System (CPS), an IBM time-sharing system under OS/360
  - Michigan Terminal System (MTS) (time-sharing system for the IBM S/360-67 and successors)
  - ITS (MIT's Incompatible Timesharing System for the DEC PDP-6 and PDP-10)
  - OS/360 MVT
  - ORVYL (Stanford University's time-sharing system for the IBM S/360-67)
  - TSS/360 (IBM's Time-sharing System for the S/360-67, never officially released, canceled in 1969 and again in 1971)
  - WAITS (SAIL, Stanford Artificial Intelligence Laboratory, time-sharing system for DEC PDP-6 and PDP-10, later TOPS-10)
- 1968
  - Airline Control Program (ACP) (IBM)
  - B1 (NCR Century series)
  - CALL/360, an IBM time-sharing system for System/360
  - HP Real-Time Executive (HP RTE) – Hewlett-Packard
  - HP Time-Shared BASIC (HP TSB) – Hewlett-Packard (time-sharing system for the HP 2000)
  - NLS (oN-Line System)
  - THE multiprogramming system (Eindhoven University of Technology) publication
  - TSS/8 (DEC for the PDP-8)
  - VP/CSS
- 1969
  - B2 (NCR Century series)
  - B3 (NCR Century series)
  - GEORGE 3 For ICL 1900 series
  - MINIMOP
  - Multics (MIT, GE, Bell Labs for the GE-645 and later the Honeywell 6180) (opened for paying customers in October)
  - RC 4000 Multiprogramming System (RC)
  - TENEX (Bolt, Beranek and Newman for DEC systems, later TOPS-20)
  - Unics (later Unix) (AT&T, initially on DEC computers)
  - Xerox Operating System

=== 1970s ===
- 1970
  - DOS-11 (PDP-11)
- 1971
  - EMAS
  - Kronos
  - RSTS-11 2A-19 (First released version; PDP-11)
  - RSX-15
  - OS/8
- 1972
  - B4 (NCR Century series)
  - COS-300
  - Data General RDOS
  - Edos
  - MUSIC/SP
  - OS/4
  - OS 1100
  - OS/2000 (Honeywell 2000-series)
  - Operating System/Virtual Storage 1 (OS/VS1)
  - Operating System/Virtual Storage 2 R1 (OS/VS2 SVS)
  - PRIMOS (written in FORTRAN IV, that didn't have pointers, while later versions, around version 18, written in a version of PL/I, called PL/P)
  - Virtual Machine/Basic System Extensions Program Product (BSEPP or VM/SE)
  - Virtual Machine/System Extensions Program Product (SEPP or VM/BSE)
  - Virtual Machine Facility/370 (VM/370), sometimes known as VM/CMS
- 1973
  - Эльбрус-1 (Elbrus-1) – Soviet computer – created using high-level language uЭль-76 (AL-76/ALGOL 68)
  - Alto OS
  - CP-V (Control Program V)
  - DynaTAC mobile system (for DynaTAC 8000X)
  - RSX-11D
  - RT-11
  - VME – implementation language S3 (ALGOL 68)
- 1974
  - ACOS-2 (NEC)
  - ACOS-4
  - ACOS-6
  - CP/M
  - DOS-11 V09-20C (Last stable release, June 1974)
  - Hydra – capability-based, multiprocessing OS kernel
  - MONECS
  - Multi-Programming Executive (MPE) – Hewlett-Packard
  - Operating System/Virtual Storage 2 R2 (MVS)
  - OS/7
  - OS/16
  - OS/32
  - Sintran III
- 1975
  - BS2000 V2.0 (First released version)
  - COS-350
  - ISIS
  - NOS (Control Data Corporation)
  - OS/3 (Univac)
  - VS/9 (formerly RCA's TSOS, later named VMOS)
  - Version 6 Unix
  - XVM/DOS
  - XVM/RSX
- 1976
  - Cambridge CAP computer – all operating system procedures written in ALGOL 68C, with some closely associated protected procedures in BCPL
  - Cray Operating System
  - DX10
  - FLEX
  - TOPS-20
  - TX990/TXDS
  - Tandem Nonstop OS v1
  - Thoth
- 1977
  - 1BSD
  - AMOS
  - KERNAL
  - OASIS operating system
  - OS68
  - OS4000
  - RMX-80
  - System 88 (Exec)
  - System Support Program (IBM System/34 and System/36)
  - TRSDOS
  - Virtual Memory System (VMS) V1.0 (Initial commercial release, October 25)
  - VRX (Virtual Resource eXecutive)
  - VS Virtual Memory Operating System
- 1978
  - 2BSD
  - Apple DOS
  - Control Program Facility (IBM System/38)
  - Cray Time Sharing System (CTSS)
  - DPCX (IBM)
  - DPPX (IBM)
  - HDOS
  - KSOS – secure OS design from Ford Aerospace
  - KVM/370 – security retro-fit of IBM VM/370
  - Lisp machine (CADR)
  - MVS/System Extensions (MVS/SE)
  - OS4 (Naked Mini 4)
  - PTDOS
  - TRIPOS
  - UCSD p-System (First released version)
  - Z80-RIO
- 1979
  - Atari DOS
  - 3BSD
  - CP-6
  - Idris
  - MP/M
  - MVS/System Extensions R2 (MVS/SE2)
  - NLTSS
  - POS
  - Sinclair BASIC
  - Transaction Processing Facility (TPF) (IBM)
  - UCLA Secure UNIX – an early secure UNIX OS based on security kernel
  - UNIX/32V
  - DOS/VSE
  - Version 7 Unix

=== 1980s ===
- 1980
  - 86-DOS
  - AOS/VS (Data General)
  - Business Operating System
  - CTOS
  - DOSPLUS (TRS-80)
  - MVS/System Product (MVS/SP) V1
  - NewDos/80
  - OS-9
  - RMX-86
  - RS-DOS
  - SOS
  - Virtual Machine/System Product (VM/SP)
  - Xenix
- 1981
  - Acorn MOS
  - Aegis SR1 (First Apollo/DOMAIN systems shipped on March 27)
  - CP/M-86
  - DRX (Distributed Resource Executive)
  - iMAX – OS for Intel's iAPX 432 capability machine
  - MCS (Multi-user Control System)
  - MS-DOS
  - PC DOS
  - Pilot (Xerox Star operating system)
  - UNOS
  - UTS
  - V
  - VERSAdos
  - VRTX
  - VSOS (Virtual Storage Operating System)
  - Xinu first release
- 1982
  - Commodore DOS
  - LDOS (By Logical Systems, Inc. – for the Radio Shack TRS-80 Models I, II & III)
  - PCOS (Olivetti M20)
  - pSOS
  - QNX
  - Stratus VOS
  - Sun UNIX (later SunOS) 0.7
  - Ultrix
  - Unix System III
  - VAXELN
- 1983
  - Coherent
  - DNIX
  - EOS
  - GNU (project start)
  - Lisa Office System 7/7
  - LOCUS – UNIX compatible, high reliability, distributed OS
  - MVS/System Product V2 (MVS/Extended Architecture, MVS/XA)
  - Microsoft Interface Manager
  - Novell NetWare (S-Net)
  - PERPOS
  - ProDOS
  - RTU (Real-Time Unix)
  - STOP – TCSEC A1-class, secure OS for SCOMP hardware
  - SunOS 1.0
  - VSE/System Package (VSE/SP) Version 1
- 1984
  - AMSDOS
  - CTIX (Unix variant)
  - DYNIX
  - Mac OS (System 1.0)
  - MSX-DOS
  - NOS/VE
  - PANOS
  - PC/IX
  - ROS
  - Sinclair QDOS
  - SINIX
  - UNICOS
  - Venix 2.0
  - Virtual Machine/Extended Architecture Migration Assistance (VM/XA MA)
- 1985
  - AmigaOS
  - Atari TOS
  - DG/UX
  - DOS Plus
  - Graphics Environment Manager
  - Harmony
  - Mac OS (System 2)
  - MIPS RISC/os
  - Oberon – written in Oberon
  - SunOS 2.0
  - Version 8 Unix
  - Virtual Machine/Extended Architecture System Facility (VM/XA SF)
  - Windows 1.0
  - Windows 1.01
  - Xenix 2.0
- 1986
  - AIX 1.0
  - Cronus distributed OS
  - FlexOS
  - GEMSOS – TCSEC A1-class, secure kernel for BLACKER VPN & GTNP
  - GEOS
  - Genera 7.0
  - HP-UX
  - Mac OS (System 3)
  - SunOS 3.0
  - TR-DOS
  - TRIX
  - Version 9 Unix
- 1987
  - Arthur (much improved version came in 1989 under the name RISC OS)
  - BS2000 V9.0
  - IRIX (3.0 is first SGI version)
  - Mac OS (System 4, 5)
  - MDOS
  - MINIX 1.0
  - OS/2 (1.0)
  - PC-MOS/386
  - Topaz – semi-distributed OS for DEC Firefly workstation written in Modula-2+ and garbage collected
  - VxWorks
  - Windows 2.0
- 1988
  - A/UX (Apple Computer)
  - AOS/VS II (Data General)
  - CP/M rebranded as DR-DOS
  - Flex machine – tagged, capability machine with OS and other software written in ALGOL 68RS
  - GS/OS
  - HeliOS 1.0
  - KeyKOS – capability-based microkernel for IBM mainframes with automated persistence of app data
  - LynxOS
  - Mac OS (System 6)
  - MVS/System Product V3 (MVS/Enterprise Systems Architecture, MVS/ESA)
  - OS/2 (1.1)
  - OS/400
  - RISC iX
  - SpartaDOS X
  - SunOS 4.0
  - TOPS-10 7.04 (Last stable release, July 1988)
  - Virtual Machine/Extended Architecture System Product (VM/XA SP)
  - VAX VMM – TCSEC A1-class, VMM for VAX computers (limited use before cancellation)
- 1989
  - Army Secure Operating System (ASOS) – TCSEC A1-class secure, real-time OS for Ada applications
  - EPOC (EPOC16)
  - NeXTSTEP (1.0)
  - OS/2 (1.2)
  - RISC OS (First release was to be called Arthur 2, but was renamed to RISC OS 2, and was first sold as RISC OS 2.00 in April 1989)
  - SCO UNIX (Release 3)
  - TSX-32
  - Version 10 Unix
  - Xenix 2.3.4 (Last stable release)

=== 1990s ===
- 1990
  - AIX 3.0
  - AmigaOS 2.0
  - BeOS (v1)
  - DOS/V
  - Genera 8.0
  - iS-DOS
  - LOCK – TCSEC A1-class secure system with kernel and hardware support for type enforcement
  - MVS/ESA SP Version 4
  - Novell NetWare 3
  - OS/2 1.3
  - OSF/1
  - RTEMS
  - PC/GEOS
  - Windows 3.0
  - Virtual Machine/Enterprise Systems Architecture (VM/XA ESA)
  - VSE/Enterprise Systems Architecture (VSE/ESA) Version 1
- 1991
  - Amoeba – microkernel-based, POSIX-compliant, distributed OS
  - GNO/ME
  - Linux 0.01-0.1
  - Mac OS (System 7)
  - MINIX 1.5
  - PenPoint OS
  - RISC OS 3
  - SUNMOS
  - Trusted Xenix – rewritten & security enhanced Xenix evaluated at TCSEC B2-class
  - Windows Janus
- 1992
  - 386BSD 0.1
  - Amiga Unix 2.01 (Latest stable release)
  - AmigaOS 3.0
  - ANDOS (DOS-like operating system for the Electronika BK series computers)
  - BSD/386, by BSDi and later known as BSD/OS.
  - LGX
  - MPE/iX 4.0
  - MagiC (as Mag!X or MagiX)
  - OpenVMS V1.0 (First OpenVMS AXP (Alpha) specific version, November 1992)
  - OS/2 2.0 (First i386 32-bit based version)
  - Plan 9 First Edition (First public release was made available to universities)
  - RSTS/E 10.1 (Last stable release, September 1992)
  - SLS
  - Solaris 2.0 (Successor to SunOS 4.x; based on SVR4 instead of BSD)
  - Windows 3.1
- 1993
  - IBM 4690 Operating System
  - FreeBSD
  - NetBSD
  - Novell NetWare 4
  - Newton OS
  - Nucleus RTOS
  - Open Genera 1.0
  - OS 2200 (Unisys)
  - OS/2 2.1
  - PTS-DOS
  - Slackware 1.0
  - Spring
  - Windows NT 3.1 (First Windows NT kernel public release)
  - Windows Chicago
- 1994
  - AIX 4.0, 4.1
  - IBM MVS/ESA SP Version 5
  - Mac OS (System 7.5)
  - NetBSD 1.0 (First multi-platform release, October 1994)
  - OS/2 Warp 3.0
  - Red Hat
  - RISC OS 3.5
  - SPIN – extensible OS written in Modula-3
- 1995
  - Digital UNIX (aka Tru64 UNIX)
  - OpenBSD
  - OS/390
  - Plan 9 Second Edition (Commercial second release version was made available to the general public.)
  - SMSQ/E
  - Ultrix 4.5 (Last major release)
  - Windows 95
- 1996
  - AIX 4.2
  - Debian 1.1
  - JN – microkernel OS for embedded, Java apps
  - Mac OS 7.6 (First officially-named Mac OS)
  - OS/2 Warp 4.0
  - Palm OS
  - RISC OS 3.6
  - Windows NT 4.0
  - Windows CE 1.0
- 1997
  - AIX 4.3
  - DR-WebSpyder 1.0
  - EPOC (EPOC32)
  - Inferno
  - Mac OS (System 7.6)
  - Mac OS 8
  - MINIX 2.0
  - Nemesis
  - RISC OS 3.7
  - SkyOS
  - Windows CE 2.0
  - Windows Memphis
  - Windows NT 5.0
- 1998
  - DR-WebSpyder 2.0
  - Junos
  - Mac OS 8.1, 8.5
  - Novell NetWare 5
  - RT-11 5.7 (Last stable release, October 1998)
  - Solaris 7 (first 64-bit Solaris release – names from this point drop "2.", otherwise would've been Solaris 2.7)
  - Windows 98
- 1999
  - Amiga OS 3.5 (unofficial)
  - AROS (Boot for the first time in Stand Alone version)
  - Inferno Second Edition (Last distribution (Release 2.3, c. July 1999) from Lucent's Inferno Business Unit)
  - Mac OS 8.6, Mac OS 9
  - OS/2 Warp 4.5
  - RISC OS 4
  - Windows 98 (2nd edition)

== 21st Century ==
=== 2000s ===
Year–month	Microsoft	Apple	BSD	Linux	Others
2000–01					
2000–02	Windows 2000				Solaris 8
2000–03			FreeBSD 4.0	Red Hat Linux 6.2E	AtheOS; BeOS R5
2000–04	Pocket PC 2000				
2000–05					MenuetOS
2000–06	Windows CE 3.0		OpenBSD 2.7		Plan 9 Third Edition
2000–07	Windows 2000 Service Pack 1				OS/400 V4R5
2000–08				Debian 2.2	MorphOS 0.1
2000–09	Windows Millennium Edition	Mac OS X Public Beta		SUSE Linux 7.0	
2000–10	Windows Whistler				z/OS z/VM; MorphOS 0.2
2000–11					
2000–12			NetBSD 1.5; OpenBSD 2.8		AmigaOS 3.9; HP-UX 11i
2001–01		Mac OS 9.1			
2001–02					MorphOS 0.4
2001–03		Mac OS X Cheetah (v10.0)			
2001–04					
2001–05	Windows 2000 Service Pack 2				AIX 5L 5.1; OS/400 V5R1
2001–06			OpenBSD 2.9		
2001–07		Mac OS 9.2			eComStation 1.0
2001–08					Haiku
2001–09		Mac OS X Puma (v10.1)			
2001–10	Pocket PC 2002; Windows XP; Windows XP 64-bit Edition 2002				Novell NetWare 6.0
2001–11					
2001–12			OpenBSD 3.0		OS/2 4.52
2002–01	Windows CE 4.x				JX microkernel for Java; Sanos microkernel for net appliances K42 microkernel for NUMA machines
2002–02					
2002–03				Red Hat Enterprise Linux 2.1 AS	
2002–04				SUSE Linux 8.0	Plan 9 Fourth Edition
2002–05			OpenBSD 3.1		Solaris 9 (SPARC)
2002–06					
2002–07	Windows Longhorn			Debian 3.0	Syllable 0.4.0
2002–08	Windows 2000 Service Pack 3	Mac OS X Jaguar (v10.2)			OS/400 V5R2
2002–09	Windows XP Service Pack 1		NetBSD 1.6		OS2000
2002–10					AIX 5.2
2002–11			OpenBSD 3.2		MorphOS 1.0
2002–12					MorphOS 1.1
2003–01			FreeBSD 5.0		Solaris 9 (x86); JNode – JavaOS successor
2003–02					MorphOS 1.2; ReactOS 0.1.0
2003–03	Windows XP 64-bit Edition 2003				MorphOS 1.3
2003–04	Windows Server 2003				eComStation 1.1
2003–05			OpenBSD 3.3	Red Hat Enterprise Linux 2.1 ES	
2003–06	Windows 2000 Service Pack 4 Windows Mobile 2003				OpenVMS 8.0
2003–07					
2003–08					Novell NetWare 6.5; MorphOS 1.4
2003–09					HP-UX 11i v2
2003–10		Mac OS X Panther (v10.3)		Red Hat Enterprise Linux 3 SUSE Linux 9.0	
2003–11			OpenBSD 3.4	Fedora Core 1	
2003–12				Linux 2.6.0	XTS-400
2004–01				Linux 2.6.1	ReactOS 0.2.0
2004–02				Linux 2.6.2, 2.6.3	
2004–03				Linux 2.6.4	ReactOS 0.2.1
2004–04				Linux 2.6.5	ReactOS 0.2.2
2004–05			OpenBSD 3.5	Linux 2.6.6; Fedora Core 2	
2004–06					i5/OS V5R3; ReactOS 0.2.3
2004–07			DragonFly BSD 1.0		
2004–08	Windows CE 5.x Windows XP Service Pack 2			Linux 2.6.8	AIX 5.3 eComStation 1.2
2004–09					ReactOS 0.2.4
2004–10				Linux 2.6.9; Ubuntu 4.10	
2004–11			OpenBSD 3.6	Fedora Core 3	
2004–12			NetBSD 2.0	Linux 2.6.10	
2005–01					Solaris 10; ReactOS 0.2.5
2005–02				Red Hat Enterprise Linux 4	OpenVMS 8.2 z/VSE
2005–03	Windows Server 2003 Service Pack 1 Windows XP Professional x64 Edition			Linux 2.6.11; Novell Open Enterprise Server	MorphOS 1.4.4
2005–04		Mac OS X Tiger (v10.4)	DragonFly BSD 1.2	Ubuntu 5.04	ReactOS 0.2.6; MorphOS 1.4.5
2005–05	Windows Mobile 5.0		OpenBSD 3.7		
2005–06				Linux 2.6.12; Fedora Core 4 Debian 3.1	
2005–07					
2005–08				Linux 2.6.13	ReactOS 0.2.7; MorphOS 1.4.5 Classic
2005–09					
2005–10				Linux 2.6.14; Ubuntu 5.10; SUSE Linux 10.0	ReactOS 0.2.8
2005–11			FreeBSD 6.0; OpenBSD 3.8		
2005–12			NetBSD 3.0		ReactOS 0.2.9
2006–01			DragonFly BSD 1.4	Linux 2.6.15	i5/OS V5R4; Solaris 10 1/06
2006–02					
2006–03	Windows Server 2003 R2			Linux 2.6.16; Fedora Core 5	
2006–04					
2006–05			OpenBSD 3.9		SymbOS; MINIX 3.1.2
2006–06				Linux 2.6.17; Ubuntu 6.06 (LTS)	Solaris 10 6/06
2006–07			DragonFly BSD 1.6		
2006–08					BS2000/OSD v7.0 ReactOS 0.3.0
2006–09	Windows CE 6.0			Linux 2.6.18	FreeDOS 1.0; OpenVMS 8.3
2006–10				Fedora Core 6 Ubuntu 6.10; Slackware 11.0	
2006–11			OpenBSD 4.0	Linux 2.6.19	AmigaOS 4.0; Solaris 10 11/06
2006–12					
2007–01	Windows Vista		DragonFly BSD 1.8	Bharat Operating System Solutions	
2007–02	Windows Mobile 6.0			Linux 2.6.20	Inferno Fourth Edition
2007–03	Windows Server 2003 Service Pack 2			Red Hat Enterprise Linux 5	ReactOS 0.3.1
2007–04				Linux 2.6.21; Ubuntu 7.04; Debian 4.0	
2007–05		iPhone OS 1	OpenBSD 4.1	Fedora Linux 7	
2007–06					
2007–07				Linux 2.6.22; Slackware 12.0	
2007–08			DragonFly BSD 1.10		Solaris 10 8/07
2007–09		iPhone OS 1.1			HP-UX 11i v3 ReactOS 0.3.3
2007–10		Mac OS X Leopard (v10.5)		Linux 2.6.23; Ubuntu 7.10	OpenVMS 8.3-1H1
2007–11	Windows Home Server		OpenBSD 4.2	Fedora Linux 8 gOS	AIX 6.1,
2007–12			NetBSD 4.0		
2008–01				Linux 2.6.24	ReactOS 0.3.4
2008–02	Windows Vista Service Pack 1 Windows Server 2008		DragonFly BSD 1.12; FreeBSD 7.0		
2008–03					IBM i 6.1; Singularity 1.1
2008–04	Windows Mobile 6.1; Windows XP Service Pack 3			Linux 2.6.25; Ubuntu 8.04 (LTS)	
2008–05			OpenBSD 4.3	Fedora Linux 9 Slackware 12.1	Solaris 10 5/08; OpenSolaris 2008.05; BS2000/OSD v8.0A
2008–06				SUSE Linux 11.0	MorphOS 2.0; ReactOS 0.3.5
2008–07		iPhone OS 2	DragonFly BSD 2.0	Linux 2.6.26	
2008–08					STOP 6.5; ReactOS 0.3.6
2008–09		iPhone OS 2.1			AmigaOS 4.1 z/OS V1R10; MorphOS 2.1
2008–10				Linux 2.6.27; Ubuntu 8.10; Android 1.0	Solaris 10 10/08; OKL4 3.0
2008–11		iPhone OS 2.2	OpenBSD 4.4	Fedora Linux 10	Singularity 2.0; ReactOS 0.3.7; Genode 8.11
2008–12				Linux 2.6.28; Slackware 12.2	MorphOS 2.2; OpenSolaris 2008.11
2009–01					
2009–02			DragonFly BSD 2.2	Debian 5.0; Android 1.1	ReactOS 0.3.8
2009–03				Linux 2.6.29	
2009–04			NetBSD 5.0	Ubuntu 9.04; Android 1.5	ReactOS 0.3.9
2009–05	Windows Mobile 6.5; Windows Vista Service Pack 2		OpenBSD 4.5		Solaris 10 5/09
2009–06		iPhone OS 3		Linux 2.6.30; Fedora Linux 11; Palm webOS 1	AmigaOS 4.1; OpenSolaris 2009.06
2009–07					ReactOS 0.3.10
2009–08		Mac OS X Snow Leopard (v10.6)		Slackware 13.0	MorphOS 2.3
2009–09		iPhone OS 3.1	DragonFly BSD 2.4	Linux 2.6.31; Android 1.6	
2009–10	Windows 7 Windows Server 2008 R2		OpenBSD 4.6	Ubuntu 9.10; Android 2.0	Solaris 10 10/09; MorphOS 2.4
2009–11			FreeBSD 8.0	Fedora Linux 12 openSUSE 11.2	
2009–12				Linux 2.6.32	ReactOS 0.3.11

=== 2010s ===
Year–month	Microsoft	Apple	BSD	Linux	Others
2010–01				Android 2.1	AmigaOS 4.1 Upd. 1
2010–02				Linux 2.6.33	
2010–03					
2010–04		iPhone OS 3.2	DragonFly BSD 2.6	Ubuntu 10.04 (LTS)	AmigaOS 4.1 Upd. 2 IBM i 7.1
2010–05			OpenBSD 4.7	Linux 2.6.34; Fedora Linux 13; Android 2.2	eComStation 2.0
2010–06		iOS 4			MorphOS 2.5; OpenVMS 8.4
2010–07				openSUSE 11.3	
2010–08				Linux 2.6.35	
2010–09		iOS 4.1			Solaris 10 9/10; AIX 7.1
2010–10	Windows Phone 7		DragonFly BSD 2.8	Linux 2.6.36; Fedora Linux 14; Ubuntu 10.10	MorphOS 2.6; ReactOS 0.3.12
2010–11		iOS 4.2	NetBSD 5.1; OpenBSD 4.8	Red Hat Enterprise Linux 6	
2010–12				Android 2.3	MorphOS 2.7
2011–01				Linux 2.6.37	
2011–02	Windows 7 Service Pack 1			Debian 6.0; Android 3.0	
2011–03	Windows CE 7.0	iOS 4.3		Linux 2.6.38 openSUSE 11.4	ReactOS 0.3.13
2011–04	Windows Home Server 2011		DragonFly BSD 2.10	Ubuntu 11.04; Slackware 13.37	
2011–05			OpenBSD 4.9	Linux 2.6.39; Fedora Linux 15; Android 3.1	AmigaOS 4.1 Upd. 1 (for Classic) eComStation 2.1
2011–06		iOS 5		ChromeOS (first shipped)	9front
2011–07		Mac OS X Lion (v10.7)		Linux 3.0; Android 3.2; HP webOS 3	AmigaOS 4.1 Upd. 3
2011–08					
2011–09	Windows Phone 7.5				
2011–10				Linux 3.1; Ubuntu 11.10; Android 4.0	
2011–11			OpenBSD 5.0	Fedora Linux 16 openSUSE 12.1	Solaris 11 11/11
2011–12					AmigaOS 4.1 Upd. 4
2012–01			FreeBSD 9.0	Linux 3.2	FreeDOS 1.1
2012–02			DragonFly BSD 3.0		ReactOS 0.3.14; Minix 3.2
2012–03		iOS 5.1		Linux 3.3; Android 4.0.4	
2012–04				Ubuntu 12.04 (LTS)	
2012–05			OpenBSD 5.1	Linux 3.4; Fedora Linux 17	DexOS
2012–06					BS2000/OSD 9.0; MorphOS 3.0
2012–07		OS X Mountain Lion (v10.8)		Linux 3.5; Android 4.1 openSUSE 12.2	MorphOS 3.1; AmigaOS 4.1 Upd. 5
2012–08					
2012–09	Windows Server 2012	iOS 6		Linux 3.6; Slackware 14.0; Qubes OS	
2012–10	Windows 8 Windows Phone 8		NetBSD 6.0; OpenBSD 5.2	Ubuntu 12.10	Solaris 11.1
2012–11			DragonFly BSD 3.2	Android 4.2	Haiku R1 Alpha 4
2012–12			FreeBSD 9.1		
2013–01		iOS 6.1		Fedora Linux 18	BlackBerry 10; Solaris 10 1/13
2013–02	Windows Phone 7.8				
2013–03				openSUSE 12.3	
2013–04			DragonFly BSD 3.4	Linux 3.9; Ubuntu 13.04	
2013–05			NetBSD 6.1; OpenBSD 5.3	Debian 7.0	ReactOS 0.3.15; MorphOS 3.2
2013–06	Windows CE 8.0 (2013)			Linux 3.10	
2013–07				Fedora Linux 19; Android 4.3	
2013–08					
2013–09		iOS 7	FreeBSD 9.2	Linux 3.11	MorphOS 3.3 z/OS Version 2.1
2013–10	Windows 8.1; Windows Server 2012 R2	OS X Mavericks (v10.9)		Ubuntu 13.10	
2013–11			DragonFly BSD 3.6; OpenBSD 5.4	Slackware 14.1 openSUSE 13.1; Android 4.4; Linux 3.12	
2013–12				Fedora Linux 20	MorphOS 3.4; Muen separation kernel
2014–01			FreeBSD 10.0	Linux 3.13	
2014–02					ReactOS 0.3.16; MorphOS 3.5
2014–03		iOS 7.1		Linux 3.14	
2014–04	Windows Phone 8.1			Ubuntu 14.04 (LTS)	Solaris 11.2
2014–05			OpenBSD 5.5		
2014–06			DragonFly BSD 3.8	Linux 3.15; Red Hat Enterprise Linux 7	MorphOS 3.6
2014–07					
2014–08				Linux 3.16	MorphOS 3.7
2014–09	Windows Threshold	iOS 8			Minix 3.3
2014–10		OS X Yosemite (v10.10) iOS 8.1		Ubuntu 14.10; Linux 3.17	
2014–11			OpenBSD 5.6; FreeBSD 10.1; DragonFly BSD 4.0	openSUSE 13.2; Android 5.0	IBM i 7.2; ReactOS 0.3.17
2014–12				Linux 3.18; Fedora Linux 21	
2015–01					
2015–02				Linux 3.19	
2015–03		iOS 8.2			
2015–04		iOS 8.3 watchOS 1		Linux 4.0; Debian 8.0; Ubuntu 15.04	Redox OS
2015–05				Fedora Linux 22	BS2000/OSD 10.0
2015–06		iOS 8.4		Linux 4.1	MorphOS 3.9
2015–07	Windows 10 (1507)				
2015–08			FreeBSD 10.2	Linux 4.2	
2015–09		OS X El Capitan (v10.11) iOS 9 watchOS 2	NetBSD 7.0		z/OS Version 2.2
2015–10		iOS 9.1 tvOS 9		Android 6.0; Ubuntu 15.10	AIX 7.2; Solaris 11.3
2015–11	Windows 10 November Update (1511); Windows 10 Mobile (1511)	tvOS 9.1		Linux 4.3; Fedora Linux 23 openSUSE Leap 42.1	
2015–12		iOS 9.2 watchOS 2.1 tvOS 9.2			
2016–01				Linux 4.4	Minix 3.4
2016–02					ReactOS 0.4
2016–03		iOS 9.3 watchOS 2.2 tvOS 9.3	OpenBSD 5.9; FreeBSD 10.3	Linux 4.5	
2016–04				Ubuntu 16.04	IBM i 7.3; ReactOS 0.4.1
2016–05				Linux 4.6	
2016–06				Slackware 14.2; Fedora Linux 24; Linux Mint 18	
2016–07				Linux 4.7	
2016–08	Windows 10 Anniversary Update (1607); Windows 10 Mobile Anniversary Update (1607)		DragonFly BSD 4.6	Android 7.0	ReactOS 0.4.2
2016–09	Windows Server 2016 (1607)	macOS Sierra (v10.12) iOS 10 watchOS 3 tvOS 10	OpenBSD 6.0	Linux 4.8	
2016–10		iOS 10.1 watchOS 3.1	NetBSD 7.0.2; FreeBSD 11.0	Android 7.1; Ubuntu 16.10	
2016–11				Oracle Linux 7.3; Fedora Linux 25 openSUSE Leap 42.2	ReactOS 0.4.3
2016–12		iOS 10.2 tvOS 10.1		Linux 4.9; Linux Mint 18.1	FreeDOS 1.2
2017–01					
2017–02				Linux 4.10	ReactOS 0.4.4
2017–03		iOS 10.3 watchOS 3.2 tvOS 10.2	DragonFly BSD 4.8; NetBSD 7.1		
2017–04	Windows 10 Creators Update (1703); Windows 10 Mobile Creators Update (1703)		OpenBSD 6.1	Linux 4.11; Ubuntu 17.04	
2017–05					ReactOS 0.4.5; ArcaOS 5.0.0
2017–06				Debian 9.0; Fedora Linux 26	
2017–07				Linux 4.12 openSUSE Leap 42.3	BS2000/OSD 11.0; ArcaOS 5.0.1
2017–08				Android 8.0	
2017–09		macOS High Sierra (v10.13) iOS 11 watchOS 4 tvOS 11		Linux 4.13	ReactOS 0.4.6
2017–10	Windows 10 Fall Creators Update (1709); Windows 10 Mobile Fall Creators Update (1709); Windows Server 2016 Fall Creators Update (1709)	iOS 11.1 watchOS 4.1 tvOS 11.1	OpenBSD 6.2; DragonFly BSD 5.0	Ubuntu 17.10	
2017–11				Linux 4.14; Fedora Linux 27	BareMetal 1.0.0
2017–12		iOS 11.2 watchOS 4.2 tvOS 11.2		Android 8.1	ReactOS 0.4.7
2018–01				Linux 4.15	
2018–02					ArcaOS 5.0.2
2018–03		iOS 11.3 watchOS 4.3 tvOS 11.3	NetBSD 7.1.2		Genode Sculpt EA
2018–04	Windows 10 April 2018 Update (1803)		OpenBSD 6.3; DragonFly BSD 5.2	Linux 4.16; Ubuntu 18.04 (LTS)	ReactOS 0.4.8
2018–05		iOS 11.4 tvOS 11.4		Fedora Linux 28 openSUSE Leap 15.0	
2018–06				Linux 4.17	Genode Sculpt TC
2018–07			NetBSD 8.0	SUSE Linux Enterprise 15	ReactOS 0.4.9
2018–08			NetBSD 7.2	Linux 4.18; Android 9.0	ArcaOS 5.0.3; Solaris 11.4
2018–09		macOS Mojave (v10.14) iOS 12 watchOS 5 tvOS 12			Genode Sculpt VC
2018–10	Windows 10 October 2018 Update (1809); Windows Server 2019 (1809)	iOS 12.1 watchOS 5.1 tvOS 12.1	OpenBSD 6.4	Linux 4.19; Ubuntu 18.10; Fedora Linux 29	SerenityOS
2018–11					ReactOS 0.4.10
2018–12			DragonFly BSD 5.4; FreeBSD 12.0	Linux 4.20; One UI 1.0	
2019–01					
2019–02				One UI 1.1	
2019–03		iOS 12.2 watchOS 5.2 tvOS 12.2		Linux 5.0	ReactOS 0.4.11
2019–04				Ubuntu 19.04; Fedora Linux 30	
2019–05	Windows 10 May 2019 Update (1903)	iOS 12.3 tvOS 12.3	OpenBSD 6.5 NetBSD 8.1	Linux 5.1; Red Hat Enterprise Linux 8 openSUSE Leap 15.1	
2019–06			DragonFly BSD 5.6	SUSE Linux Enterprise 15 SP1	IBM i 7.4
2019–07		iOS 12.4 watchOS 5.3 tvOS 12.4		Debian 10.0; Linux 5.2	ArcaOS 5.0.4
2019–08				One UI 1.5	
2019–09		iOS 13 iOS 13.1 iPadOS 13.1 watchOS 6 tvOS 13		Linux 5.3; Android 10.0	ReactOS 0.4.12
2019–10		iOS 13.2 iPadOS 13.2 watchOS 6.1 macOS Catalina (v10.15)	OpenBSD 6.6	Ubuntu 19.10; Fedora Linux 31	
2019–11	Windows 10 November 2019 Update (1909)		FreeBSD 12.1	Linux 5.4; One UI 2.0	
2019–12		iOS 13.3 iPadOS 13.3			

=== 2020s ===
Year–month	Microsoft	Apple	BSD	Linux	Others
2020–01				Linux 5.5	
2020–02			NetBSD 9.0	One UI 2.1	
2020–03		iOS 13.4 iPadOS 13.4 watchOS 6.2 tvOS 13.4	DragonFly BSD 5.8	Linux 5.6	
2020–04				Ubuntu 20.04; Fedora Linux 32	ReactOS 0.4.13
2020–05	Windows 10 May 2020 Update (2004)	iOS 13.5 iPadOS 13.5	OpenBSD 6.7		OpenVMS 9.0
2020–06				Linux 5.7	ArcaOS 5.0.5; Haiku R1/beta2
2020–07		iOS 13.6 iPadOS 13.6			
2020–08				Linux 5.8; One UI 2.5	ArcaOS 5.0.6
2020–09		iOS 13.7 iPadOS 13.7 iOS 14 iPadOS 14.0 watchOS 7.0 tvOS 14.0		Android 11	
2020–10	Windows 10 October 2020 Update (20H2)	iOS 14.1 iPadOS 14.1	NetBSD 9.1; OpenBSD 6.8; FreeBSD 12.2	Linux 5.9; Fedora Linux 33; Ubuntu 20.10	
2020–11		macOS Big Sur (v11.0) iOS 14.2 iPadOS 14.2 watchOS 7.1 tvOS 14.2			
2020–12		macOS Big Sur (v11.1) iOS 12.5 iOS 14.3 iPadOS 14.3 watchOS 6.3 watchOS 7.2 tvOS 14.3		Linux 5.10; One UI 3.0	
2021–01		iOS 14.4 iPadOS 14.4 watchOS 7.3 tvOS 14.4			
2021–02		macOS Big Sur (v11.2)		One UI 3.1	
2021–03					
2021–04		macOS Big Sur (v11.3) iOS 14.5 iPadOS 14.5 watchOS 7.4 tvOS 14.5	FreeBSD 13.0	Fedora Linux 34	
2021-05	Windows 10 May 2021 Update (21H1)	macOS Big Sur (v11.4) iOS 14.6 iPadOS 14.6 watchOS 7.5 tvOS 14.6	OpenBSD 6.9; DragonFly BSD 6.0; NetBSD 9.2	Linux 5.12; Ubuntu 21.04	
2021-06				Rocky Linux 8 Linux 5.13	
2021-07		macOS Big Sur (v11.5) iOS 14.7 iPadOS 14.7 watchOS 7.6 tvOS 14.7			Haiku R1/beta3
2021-08	Windows Server 2022			Linux 5.14; One UI 3.1.1; Debian 11.11	
2021-09		macOS Big Sur (v11.6) iOS 14.8 iPadOS 14.8 iOS 15 iPadOS 15.0 watchOS 8.0 tvOS 15.0			
2021-10	Windows 11	macOS Monterey (v12.0) iOS 15.1 iPadOS 15.1 watchOS 8.1 tvOS 15.1	OpenBSD 7.0	Android 12; Ubuntu 21.10	
2021-11	Windows 10 November 2021 Update (21H2)			Fedora Linux 35; One UI 4.0	
2021-12		macOS Monterey (v12.2) iOS 15.2 iPadOS 15.2 watchOS 8.3 tvOS 15.2			ArcaOS 5.0.7; ReactOS 0.4.14
2022-01		iOS 15.3 iPadOS 15.3 watchOS 8.4 tvOS 15.3	DragonFly BSD 6.2.1		
2022-02				Slackware 15.0; One UI 4.1	
2022-03		macOS Monterey (v12.3) iOS 15.4 iPadOS 15.4 watchOS 8.5 tvOS 15.4		Android 12L	
2022-04			OpenBSD 7.1	Ubuntu 22.04	
2022-05		macOS Monterey (v12.4) iOS 15.5 iPadOS 15.5 watchOS 8.6 tvOS 15.5		Fedora Linux 36	IBM i 7.5
2022-06				Rocky Linux 9	
2022-07		macOS Monterey (v12.5) iOS 15.6 iPadOS 15.6 watchOS 8.7 tvOS 15.6			
2022-08				Android 13	
2022-09	Windows 11 2022 Update (22H2)	macOS Big Sur (v11.7) macOS Monterey (v12.6) iOS 15.7 iPadOS 15.7 iOS 16 watchOS 9.0 tvOS 16.0			
2022-10	Windows 10 2022 Update (22H2)	macOS Ventura (13.0) iOS 16.1 iPadOS 16.0	OpenBSD 7.2	Ubuntu 22.10; One UI 5.0	
2022-11		macOS Ventura (13.0.1) iOS 16.1.1		Fedora Linux 37	
2022-12		iOS 16.2	DragonFly BSD 6.4		Haiku R1/beta4
2023-01					
2023-02				One UI 5.1	
2023-03					
2023-04			OpenBSD 7.3	Fedora Linux 38; Ubuntu 23.04	
2023-05					
2023-06				Debian 12.12	
2023-07					
2023-08				Linux 6.5	ArcaOS 5.1.0; HarmonyOS NEXT beta
2023-09		macOS Sonoma (14.0) iOS 17.0 iPadOS 17.0			
2023-10	Windows 11 2023 Update (23H2)		OpenBSD 7.4	Android 14 Ubuntu 23.10; One UI 6.0	
2023-11			FreeBSD 14.0	Fedora Linux 39	
2023-12					
2024-01				One UI 6.1	
2024-02					
2024-03			NetBSD 10.0		
2024-04			OpenBSD 7.5	Fedora Linux 40; Ubuntu 24.04	
2024-05					
2024-06					
2024-07				One UI 6.1.1	
2024-08					
2024-09		macOS Sequoia (15.0) iOS 18.0 iPadOS 18 watchOS 11 tvOS 18			Haiku R1/beta5
2024-10	Windows 11 2024 Update (24H2)	iOS 18.1	OpenBSD 7.6	Android 15 Fedora Linux 41 Ubuntu 24.10	
2024-11	Windows Server 2025			Linux 6.12	
2024-12					
2025-01					
2025-02					ArcaOS 5.1.1
2025-03					ReactOS 0.4.15
2025-04			DragonFly BSD 6.4.1	Fedora Linux 42 Ubuntu 25.04; One UI 7.0	IBM i 7.6
2025-05			DragonFly BSD 6.4.2 OpenBSD 7.7		
2025-06				Android 16 Rocky Linux 10	
2025-07					
2025-08				Debian 13.1	
2025-09		macOS Tahoe (26.0) iOS 26 iPadOS 26 watchOS 26 tvOS 26		One UI 8.0	
2025-10	Windows 11 2025 Update (25H2)		OpenBSD 7.8	Fedora Linux 43 Ubuntu 25.10	
2025-11					HarmonyOS 6
2025-12			FreeBSD 15.0		
2026-02	Windows 11 version 26H1				
2026–04				Linux 7.0 Ubuntu 26.04	
2026-05				One UI 8.5	
2026-06				Android 17	
2026-09	Windows 11 2026 Update (26H2)	macOS Golden Gate (27.0) iOS 27 iPadOS 27 watchOS 27 tvOS 27		One UI 9.0	HarmonyOS 7

== See also ==
- Comparison of operating systems
- List of operating systems
- Comparison of real-time operating systems
- Timeline of DOS operating systems
- Timeline of Linux distributions (diagram 1992–2010)
