= System 8 =

System 8 may refer to:

== Computing ==
- Copland, an unreleased operating system
- Mac OS 8, a late 1990s version of the Macintosh operating system
- Digital Equipment Corporation PDP-8 operating systems:
  - OS/8, released in 1971
  - TSS/8, released in 1968
  - MS/8, released in 1966
  - PDP-8 4K Disk Monitor System, released in 1965
- Exec 8, the Unisys operating system
- WPS-8 (Word Processing System-8) - Digital Equipment Corporation word processor

== Other uses ==
- STS-8 (Space Transportation System-8), the Space Shuttle mission
- Base-8 number system
- Roland System-8, the Roland Corporation synthesizer

== See also ==
- OS8 (disambiguation)

Preceded by System 7 (disambiguation)	System 8	Succeeded by System 9 (disambiguation)
