= Coupland Digital Music Synthesizer =

1970s synthesizer

The Coupland Digital Music Synthesizer is a 16-voice polyphonic real-time instrument with a full 88 key keyboard, developed in the 1970s but never released commercially.

The idea was first conceived and the basic concepts invented in 1973 by Rick Coupland and John Moore. The project lasted from 1973 until 1979, included two product version, but never reached commercial success due to inadequate funding.

In 1975, Coupland left Micor to work full-time on creating the instrument, building the first, and 8-bit version. Micor subsequently funded the project and a team including a consulting professor of music and consulting physicist, along with the usual engineers. They designed and built a prototype of the 12-bit version.

Due to funding constraints, the prototype was rushed to a showing at the NAMM conference where the fragile, wire-wrapped prototype failed to function, leading to significant embarrassment. However, the concept and design was solidly proven, and with continued funding would have been a commercial instrument representing a significant improvement in the state of the art.

The performer used a frequency domain specification of the musical voice harmonics, and created an ADSR function to modify it.

The instrument used a waveform buffer, now a widespread practice, but independently conceived by Moore and Coupland. This was driven with high precision phase generator, of which only the high order bits addressed the buffer. A subtle logarithmic algorithm (log eighth root of two) was invented to apply audio level and ADSR amplitude modulation to the signal generated for each voice. This avoided the cost and heat dissipation of available commercial multiplier modules.

A Texas Instruments TI-990 minicomputer performed the non-real-time Fast Fourier transform processing necessary to convert from the frequency domain specification to the time domain waveform buffer format. It also handled user interaction such as specifying sound parameters. The second version used a TMS9900 microprocessor for the same functions

The first version used only 8 bit precision for its output digital-to-analog conversion (DAC). The instrument suffered from aliasing, which was not due to the typical cause of too low a sample rate or inadequate post-D/A filtering. Rather, it was an inherent effect of low precision calculations in the digital circuitry - round-off error produced digital non-linearity and extra harmonics resulting in digital mixing with the sample rate. The problem was solved by dithering, which did not noticeably affect the intended output, but through the natural characteristics of human hearing caused the narrow-band high frequency alias to become imperceptible. In general, in-depth study of psychoacoustics was used to solve such problems and provide some technical constraints.

The 12 bit instrument was more advanced than the 8 bit prototype, and was enclosed in a stylishly modern plastic case with a futuristic touch-sensitive console above the keyboard. It was small and light enough to be a practical performance instrument.

The synthesizer now resides at the Musical Instrument Museum in Phoenix, AZ.

Rick Coupland passed away at his home in Flagstaff, AZ on July 3, 2026.

== Sources ==
- Mark Vail (2000). Vintage Synthesizers: pioneering designers, groundbreaking instruments, collecting tips, mutants ... Backbeat Books. pp. 83–84. ISBN 0-87930-603-3.
- "Products of Interest: Micor Inc. Coupland Digital Synthesizer". Computer Music Journal. 2 (1): 64–66. Spring 1978.
- Stephan Dargel (1995). "COUPLAND". Synrise (in German). Dariprint Softworks. Archived from the original on 2007-12-06.
- L.L. De Mars. "Coupland". Synthèse et synchronisation de la musique électronique (in French).
- "First Digital Synthesizer in LA Showcase", Billboard, 25 Feb 1978.
