= OS8 =

OS8, OS 8, or OS/8 may refer to:

- Mac OS 8, an operating system for the Apple Macintosh
- iOS 8, the eighth version of the iOS operating system
- OS/8, an operating system used on the PDP-8 minicomputer

== See also ==
- System 8 (disambiguation)
