= MONECS =

Computer operating system

- Developer: Monash University
- Written in: Assembly language
- Working state: Discontinued
- Initial release: 1974; 51 years ago
- Marketing target: Computer science education
- Available in: English
- Platforms: PDP-11 minicomputer family
- Kernel type: Monolithic kernel
- Default user interface: Batch processing

MONECS (Monash University Educational Computing System) was a computer operating system with BASIC, COBOL, FORTRAN, Pascal interpreters, plus machine language facility. Specifically designed for computer science education in Australian secondary schools and at the university undergraduate level. Alternative designations were DEAMON (Digital Equipment Australia - Monash University) or SCUBA (local designation at Melbourne University) systems.

== Overview ==
For teaching computer science students in Australian schools Monash University created subsets of the FORTRAN language, an elementary version called MINITRAN then an enhanced version called MIDITRAN. MIDITRAN versions were available for a number of different mainframe systems, i.e. Burroughs B5000/B5500 series, CDC 3000, IBM 360 and ICL 1900. Student's programs were submitted on IBM Port-a-Punch cards that can be programmed with an IBM board and stylus or even a bent paper clip. Standard 80-column punch cards were an option for students if a card punch was available.

Before the minicomputer, it was impossible for a class of Australian students to have hands-on access to a computer within a one-hour school period. Mainframes were too expensive for small schools and remote job entry equipment was typically limited to major corporations, universities and research centres.

A group at Monash University under the leadership of Dr Len G. Whitehouse solved the problem with a small PDP-11 minicomputer system that could be used in the classroom. Long term support was provided by Mrs Katherine Ching.

Mark sense cards were used, and a class of 30 children could each get two runs in a one-hour period. The Monash University series of Student FORTRAN predated and was an independent effort not associated with DEC's PDP-8 based EDUSYSTEM series which centred on the BASIC language.

MONECS was optimised for the low end hardware of the Digital Equipment Corporation (DEC) PDP-11 minicomputer family. Typical installation would be a PDP-11/03, /04, /05 /10 or D. D. Webster Electronics' Spectrum-IIB (repackaged DEC LSI) processor with 32k Bytes memory.

MONECS systems were based on the PDP-11/05 or PDP-11/10 processors with core memory. This was identical hardware rebadged by the manufacturer DEC just to indicate an OEM version. Student systems were fitted with a custom UNIBUS interface to support the Memorex 651 flexible drive which was an early version of an 8-inch floppy disk.

Next major releases were the DEAMON systems based on PDP-11/04 or PDP/11/34 processors with semiconductor memory and DEC RX01 8-inch floppy disk drive(s). Then the LSI-11 systems based systems which moved away from the UNIBUS based processors and used the PDP-11/03 and Spectrum-IIB systems.

All systems were installed with a mark sense card reader PDI, Hewlett-Packard or Documation M-200, plus a 132 column line printer from Tally, DEC, etc.

Student programs were typically submitted as a deck of mark sense cards although punched cards were an option. Due to the 32k Byte memory constraint MONECS serially processed student programs with all jobs queued in the input hopper of the cardreader. The appropriate language interpreter was loaded from the floppy disk for each job and the results printed before reading in the next student's program.

The MONECS systems were supported by staff from the Monash University Computer Centre which was an entity independent from the Computer Science Department. The Computer Centre shared facilities and staff with the Victorian Hospitals Computing Service (HCS). The Computer Centre also processed mark-sense sheets on an ICL 1800 series reader for the Victorian Education Department's Secondary Students final (year 12) examinations.

A MONECS system at St Peter's Lutheran College was the first computer available for student use in a Queensland school.

== See also ==
- Timeline of operating systems
