= Quad digital audio processor =

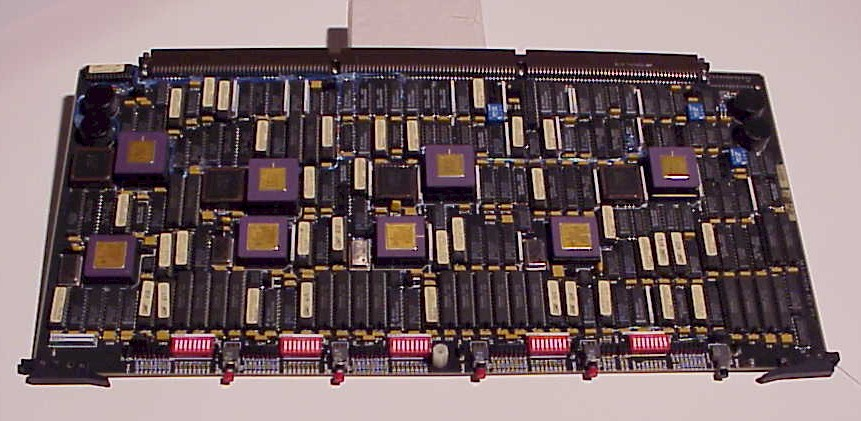
QDAP printed circuit card, circa 1987

The quad digital audio processor (QDAP) was a digital signal processor (DSP) based printed circuit card designed at Computer Consoles Inc. (CCI) in Rochester, NY. The QDAP was a service circuit module developed as part of the companies digital telephony switching system. The main function of the card was the processing of incoming digital audio to detect the speech patterns using speaker independent speech recognition. The CCI digital switch was deployed as part of the Digital Audio Intercept System (DAIS II), Automatic Voice Response (AVR), and Interactive Voice System (IVS) products. The initial QDAP board is notable for introducing speech recognition into the public telephone network to automate the handling of operator assisted telephone calls.

== Variants ==
- QDAP-I:
  - This printed circuit card, designed by Mark A. Indovina, was introduced in late 1987 and contained four TMS320C25 16-bit fixed point DSP chips operating at 40 MHz.

== Features ==
- Each TMS320C25 DSP core processed four simultaneous digital audio channels.
- The card deployed speaker independent speech recognition for multiple languages
- The speaker independent speech recognition vocabulary database could be efficiently changed by downloading an update over the switch time-slot network at any time
- The speaker independent speech recognition vocabulary database could be created by the hosting telephone company as necessary based on the call scenario
