= Richard Lary =

Richard F. "Richie" Lary (born 1948, Brooklyn, New York) is the RL of the PDP-8 RL Monitor System, which subsequently became MS/8. Years later, while working for Digital Equipment Corporation, he was also involved with other DEC hardware and software, including "principal architect for OS/8" and "working on the VAX architecture."

== Biography ==
He graduated from Stuyvesant High School in 1965, along with Steve Rothman; they both were on the school's Math Team and "later wound up working on the VAX architecture." They were $2/hour summertime Fortran programmers in 1965, using an IBM 1130.

Lary left DEC in 2000, forming a company he and his wife Ellen Lary, also a former DEC employee, named TuteLary.
