= Commercial Operating System =

Product by Digital Equipment Corporation

Commercial Operating System (COS)
- Developer: Digital Equipment Corporation
- Initial release: 1972
- Available in: English
- Supported platforms: PDP-8, PDP-11, DECmate II
- License: Proprietary
- Preceded by: MS/8

Commercial Operating System (COS) is a discontinued family of operating systems from Digital Equipment Corporation.

They supported the use of DIBOL, a programming language combining features of BASIC, FORTRAN and COBOL. COS also supported IBM RPG (Report Program Generator).

== Implementations ==
The Commercial Operating System was implemented to run on hardware from the PDP-8 and PDP-11 families.

=== COS-310 ===
COS-310 was developed for the PDP-8 to provide an operating environment for DIBOL. A COS-310 system was purchased as a package which included a desk, VT52 VDT (Video Display Tube), and a pair of eight inch floppy drives. It could optionally be purchased with one or more 2.5 MB removable media hard drives. COS-310 was one of the operating systems available on the DECmate II. (Note: the other was WPS-8) (Note: There was a product named COS-300, and some DEC manuals are named with both 300 & 310.)

=== COS-350 ===
COS-350 was developed to support the PDP-11 port of DIBOL, and was the focus for some vendors of turnkey software packages.

Pre-COS-350, a PDP 11/05 single-user batch-oriented implementation was released; the multi-user PDP 11/10-based COS came about 4 years later. The much more powerful PDP-11/34 "added significant configuration flexibility and expansion capability."

== See also ==
- Comparison of operating systems
- Timeline of operating systems
