= Computer Consoles, Inc. =

US telephony and computer company

- Industry: Telephony, computing
- Founded: May 20, 1968; 58 years ago
- Founder: Edward H. Nutter; Alfred J. Moretti
- Defunct: January 1, 1992; 34 years ago
- Fate: Acquired by Standard Telephones and Cables
- Headquarters: Rochester, New York

Computer Consoles, Inc. or CCI was a telephony and computer company located in Rochester, New York, United States, which did business first as a private, and then ultimately a public company from 1968 to 1990. CCI provided worldwide telephone companies with directory assistance equipment and other systems to automate various operator and telephony services, and later sold a line of 68k-based Unix computers and the Power 6/32 Unix supermini.

== History ==
Computer Consoles, Inc. (CCI, incorporated May 20, 1968), was founded by three Xerox employees, Edward H. Nutter, Alfred J. Moretti, and Jeffrey Tai, to develop one of the earliest versions of a smart computer terminal, principally for the telephony market. Raymond J. Hasenauer (Manufacturing), Eiji Miki (Electronic design), Walter Ponivas (Documentation) and James M. Steinke (Mechanical design) joined the company at its inception. Due to the state of the art in electronics at the time, this smart terminal was the size of an average-sized office desk.

=== Automating Operator Services ===
Due to the success of the smart computer terminal, and the expertise the company gained in understanding Operator Services, the company started development programs to offer networked computer systems that provided contract-managed access time, specified as a guaranteed number of seconds to paint the operator's first screen of information, to various telephony databases such as directory assistance and intercept messages. The largest such system was designed and installed for British Telecom to provide initially Directory Assistance throughout Great Britain and Ireland. These systems combined Digital Equipment Corporation PDP-11 computers with custom hardware and software developed by CCI.

=== Automatic Voice Response ===
To provide higher levels of automation to operator services, CCI introduced in the early 1980s various Automatic Voice Response (AVR) systems tightly integrated with its popular Directory Assistance systems. AVR provided voice response of the customer requested data, almost universally starting the prompt with a variant of the phrase, "The number is". Early systems were based on very small vocabulary synthesised speech chips, follow-on systems utilized 8-bit PCM, and later ADPCM voice playback using audio authored either by CCI or the local phone company.

=== Digital switching ===
To provide even higher levels of automation, CCI started a very aggressive program in the early 1980s to develop a PCM digital telephone switching system targeted for automated, user-defined call scenarios. Initial installations handled intercept and calling card calls by capturing multi-frequency and DTMF audio band signaling via the DSP-based multi-frequency receiver board. Later systems added speaker independent speech recognition via a quad digital audio processor board to initially automate collect calls.

=== PERPOS, Perpetual Processing Operating System ===
To provide better control over transaction processing, significant improvements in fault tolerance, and richer support for networking, CCI developed PERPOS, a Unix derivative that provided integrated support for real-time transaction processing, load balancing, and fault-tolerant features such as hot and cold standby.

=== Power 5 and Power 6 computers ===
PERPOS was developed for a line of Motorola 68000-based computers called the Power 5 series, which CCI developed. They were a line of multi-processor, fault-tolerant computers, code-named after the Great Lakes. The Power 5 line also included single-processor 68000-based computers, code-named after the Finger Lakes, running a regular Unix port called PERPOS-S, which was originally a Version 7-derived kernel with a System III-derived userland; the kernel was later modified to provide System III compatibility.

Later, Computer Consoles opened a development center in Irvine, California, United States, which developed a proprietary minicomputer, competitive with the Digital Equipment Corporation VAX, called the Power 6/32, code-named "Tahoe" after Lake Tahoe. It ran an internally developed BSD port, and the Computer Systems Research Group at the University of California, Berkeley also ported 4.3BSD to it, producing the release known as "4.3-Tahoe". Sperry Corporation remarketed the Power 6 as the 7000 series (referred to as U7000 after the merger with Burroughs to form Unisys.) Harris Computer Systems also sold the Power 6 as the HCX-7 and HCX-9. A companion 68010-based machine, the Power 5/32, also ran the internally developed BSD port; it was code-named "Walden" after Walden Pond.

In 1985, CCI launched a floating-point accelerator for the Power 6 line, claiming a performance of 7.5 million Whetstone instructions per second for single-precision operations. Targeted as a competitor to the Unix/VAX platform, it succeeded for solutions where processing power was paramount. Universities requiring time-shared compilation engines for their students were particularly keen. The machine suffered when applied to general purpose database application environments, not least because the I/O subsystem over-relied on the central processing power (much as the VAX did) and thus used relatively dumb I/O processors. The Power 6 running either version of Unix also suffered from the inefficient memory management inherent in BSD 4.3. The core of this was the use of a 512-byte page rather than a 4-kilobyte page. Leffer et al. suggest they did this due to concerns about VAX support of 4K dynamic paging. The Power 6 had no such problems, but no operating system to support it.

The final issue with the Power 6/32 running Unix was the lack of support for symmetric multiprocessing: All system calls would have to run on the "Master" processor, forcing a dual-processing machine to reschedule a process from the "slave" processor for every system call. The net result of this meant database benchmarks often ran faster on a single processor than a dual.

=== Power 7 ===
CCI announced the development of the 64-bit Power 7/64 minicomputer series in 1988, featuring a RISC architecture "reasonably similar" to the SPARC architecture, having also been derived from the foundational Berkeley RISC work. This architectural similarity was ostensibly to be exploited by a SPARC-to-Power 7 translator developed by Hunter Systems, producers of the XDOS portability tool that permitted DOS software to run on Motorola 68020-based Unix systems. The CMOS devices employed by the Power 7 chipset were to be fabricated by Performance Semiconductor and were envisaged as running as fast as 50 MHz.

The 1989 acquisition of CCI by STC was described in reporting as a "happy corporate wedding", building on existing collaborations between CCI and STC's subsidiary International Computers Limited (ICL), with the Power 7 line seemingly of interest to ICL. However, work on the Power 7 architecture was dropped in favour of SPARC-based machines designed by ICL. The ICL machines were anticipated to arrive eight months earlier than CCI's machines and were reported to be faster and cheaper. ICL would eventually bring these systems to market in early 1990 as the DRS 6000 range.

Power 7/64 performance had been simulated to deliver around 30.2 VUP, in comparison to around 10.8 VUP for the SPARC-based Sun 4/200. With the SPARC binary translation software claimed to run SPARC software at 55% of the speed of Power 7/64 native binaries, CCI claimed that this would make the machine faster at running SPARC software than any available SPARC processor. In comparison, ICL's DRS 6000 models employed faster 25 MHz and 33 MHz SPARC processors, claiming speeds of 17.5 MIPS and 23 MIPS.

=== Office automation ===
Due to the success the firm had in network-based data management, they partnered with, and ultimately acquired, a small company in Reston, Virginia, called RLG Corporation (named after founder Richard L Gauthier), to develop a terminal-based integrated office automation system. RLG had had experience developing this kind of system for the United States Department of Transportation. The office suite, called OfficePower, provided an integrated set of functions such as word processing, spreadsheet, email, and database access via a compact desktop smart terminal backed by a mini, or super mini-computer. Although the system software was ported to various Unix variants, most installations were hosted on CCI's Power 5 and Power 6 machines running CCI's Unix ports.

One installation was at the US Naval Surface Weapons Center in Dahlgren, Virginia; it consisted of two VAXes running 4.2BSD and a number of Power 5/20 machines running PERPOS-S. The VAXes were connected to each other by an Ethernet, but, at the time, it wasn't cost-effective to provide Ethernet adapters on all the Power 5/20 machines. The Power 5/20s were using 3Com's UNET as their TCP/IP implementation; it included an encapsulation scheme for sending IP datagrams over serial lines. Rick Adams implemented this encapsulation scheme as a line discipline for 4.2BSD; this was the origin of SLIP.

After the takeover of CCI by Standard Telephones and Cables (STC) (see below), OfficePower was developed as the primary office system for International Computers Limited (ICL), owned by STC, with ports for the ICL DRS range and later servers with Power 6/32, Motorola 68030, Intel x86 and Sun SPARC architectures. It continued to be used widely by ICL customers into the late 1990s.

== CCI (Europe) Inc ==
CCI (Europe) Inc was the wholly owned European Sales, Marketing and Support operation based in West London and established with Richard Levy (Altergo, Wang) as European Vice President, with responsibilities for all business aspects outside of North America. Richard Levy recruited industry professionals to target specific market sectors and distribution channels for the European and International markets for the entire CCI range of computer and telephony products.

CCI (Europe) maintained close co-operation with Rochester, NY for the manufacturing, stock & shipping and Irvine, CA for planning & management. Liaising closely with the Israeli R&D operation for international systems translation, CCI Europe established a solid base in major European accounts and International third-party Distribution channels such as ICL & BT and became an integral aspect of the parent company.

== CCI Israel, Inc. ==
CCI Israel, Inc. was a separately incorporated Delaware corporation however it was closely affiliated with the Rochester, NY, Irvine, CA and Reston, VA operations of Computer Consoles, Inc (CCI). It was first established to manage a telephony project for the Israeli national telephone company, Bezeq. The initial Israeli project was based on products developed in the Rochester-based group.

In Israel, development and installation was managed by CCI-Israel's managing director, Jacob "Jack" Mark. Mr. Mark, was earlier affiliated with the original Bell Labs team to which the core development of the Unix operating system is attributed. The small Ramat Gan-based office later grew to support the efforts of the U.S.-based CCI offices, eventually becoming a major research and development center for machine level/operating systems products, telephony products, office automation products (particularly for British and foreign language "OfficePower").

CCI Israel also undertook local development projects for major clients - notably Motorola and Israel Aircraft Industries. In the mid-1980s CCI-Israel introduced the U.S. companies' brand of 5/32 and 6/32 micro- and mini-computers to the local Israeli market. CCI-Israel - through seminars and training groups - was also instrumental in developing and popularizing the Unix operating system and the C programming language in Israel. CCI-Israel was also responsible for establishing the first Unix "User Group" in that country.

== Accomplishments ==
CCI actively participated in various telecom and public standard bodies such as ANSI, and in the development of Unix and the C programming language. It was a pioneer of design and deployment of real-time, transaction processing computer systems, of true fault tolerant computing systems, distributed database access and distributed file system access. CCI was one of earliest commercial entities connected to the Internet as cci.com.

CCI deployed the largest multi-processor, shared file system, Unix-based (PERPOS) system of the era in British Telecom in the late 1980s. The design concepts of the system were years ahead of its time. The company was also a pioneer of design and deployment of voice response and speech recognition to the public telephone networks to automate traditional operator-based services.

CCI controlled over 90% of the world market for equipment to automate telephony Directory services at the time of acquisition by STC.

== Acquisition by Standard Telephones and Cables ==
Standard Telephones and Cables (STC) acquired CCI effective January 1, 1989. At this time CCI was organized as two major business units: one in Rochester ("CCI - Rochester"), which manufactured telecommunications equipment, and a Computer Products Division in Irvine ("CCI - Irvine"), which manufactured computer hardware. Office systems software was produced at Reston, Virginia. In reality there was a third operation which was a financing group that held the commercial leases for equipment typically sold to telephone companies. At the time of the acquisition the lease base was rumored to be valued at over $700M US dollars.

Also at the time of the acquisition, CCI was involved in a dispute with General Telephone and Electronics ("GTE") over GTE's failure to supply CCI with certain "computer chips" for a new generation of computers being developed by CCI (the "GTE litigation").

After completion of the acquisition, CCI - Rochester became a subsidiary of an STC operating unit known as STC Telecom. Shortly thereafter, the Computer Products Division at Irvine and Office Products Centre at Reston were sold to another STC operating unit, ICL, for net book value of the assets. CCI - Rochester was kept under the jurisdiction of STC Telecom, which was also in the telecommunications business.

== Acquisition by Northern Telecom Ltd. ==
STC Telecom was acquired by Northern Telecom effective March 1991 and became part of the company's European operations. Effective January 1, 1992, CCI was transferred to the Northern Telecom U.S. entity, and was eventually merged into this business unit. At that time, CCI was dissolved and Northern Telecom assumed its assets and liabilities.

== Notable historic uses ==
Pixar Computer Animation Group employed a Power 6/32 machine to render the "Glass Man" sequence in Steven Spielberg's Young Sherlock Holmes movie (1985) and continued to use the computer for the bulk of its animation work as late as 1990.
