= Repeating waveforms =

Repeating waveforms is a technique for digital synthesis common in PC sound cards.

The waveform amplitude values are stored in a buffer memory, which is stored in a phase generator. When addressed, the retrieved value is used as the basis of the synthesized sound.

In the phase generator, a value proportional to the desired signal frequency is periodically added to an accumulator. The high order bits of the accumulator form the output address, while the typically larger number of bits in the accumulator and addition value results in an arbitrarily high frequency resolution.

== See also ==
- Sine wave
- Fourier series
- Waveform
