= ICL DRS =

Range of computers

The ICL DRS was a range of departmental computers from International Computers Limited (ICL). Standing originally for Distributed Resource System, the full name was later dropped in favour of the abbreviation.

During the mid-1980s separate Office Systems business units had produced a disparate range of products including IBM-compatible PCs such as the PWS (a PC/AT clone), small servers branded DRS, and various larger Unix servers sold under the Clan range. A rebranding in late 1988 pulled these together under the DRS brand, with a consistent mid-grey and peppermint-green livery.

The ICL division responsible for these systems eventually became part of the Fujitsu-Siemens joint venture.

== DRS 20/100/200 ==
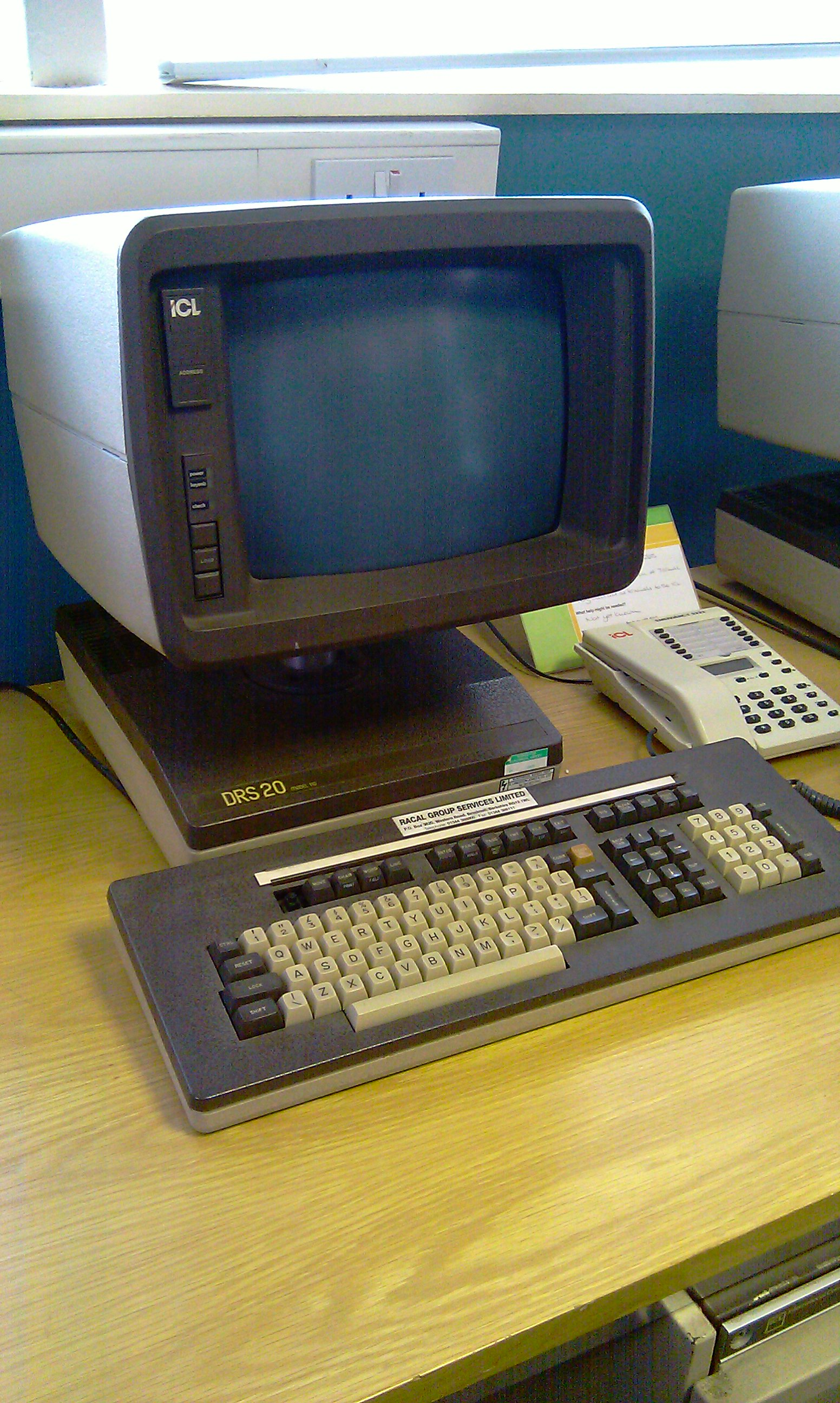
An ICL DRS20 terminal

The original DRS was the DRS 20 produced in Utica, New York and launched in September 1981. This ran the proprietary DRX (Distributed Resource Executive) operating system. The basic 'intelligent terminal' (model 10/110/210) used 8-bit 8085 processors (workstation, application and network processors), each with between 32 KB and 128 KB of memory. The Model 210 also had an 80188 application processor with 512 KB to run CP/M. The larger models 20 and 40 had floppy disk drives. The floor-standing models 50, 150, and 250 had hard disks, from which diskless models booted. In early models, these were 8" floppy disks, and later 5¼" disks.

The diskless model, that partnered the DRS 20, was the DRS 10. It had 10 KB available for applications programs developed in CIS COBOL.

Up to 16 DRS 20/DRS 10 machines could be connected via LAN with the addresses being set by DIP switches on the rear of the unit. The LAN was formed via 93 ohm coaxial cable in a bus formation running at 1.25 Mbit/s.

The final model 310 (styled like a DRS 300 module) had a second 80186 application processor with 1 MB RAM to run Concurrent DOS, emulating an IBM PC with a Hercules screen display.

== DRS 300 ==
In the mid-1980s ICL developed the DRS 300 in Kidsgrove, and ran down Utica. Launched in 1986, DRS 300 was a modular system consisting of A4-sized units designed to be placed on an office bookshelf. Modules containing a power supply (Kx), processor (Ax), hard and floppy disks (Dx), streamer tape (Sx) etc. were connected by SCSI. Initial models used a 6 MHz 80286 processor (A1 module) with up to 1 MB memory. Later modules used an 8 MHz processor (A2) or 80286 with 80287 maths coprocessor (A3) with up to 4 MB, and ran Concurrent CP/M-86 and later Concurrent DOS. Although this could run code developed under CP/M, PC DOS or MS-DOS, in practice available applications were limited because many shrink-wrapped packages developed for the IBM PC made use of direct access to the (IBM) hardware. This was addressed through use of softclone technology to intercept such calls. However, this required the continual release of patches for new application versions.

ICL produced the DRS300 Management System, utilising the NEC 7220 graphics display controller in its Submodule 5 (SM5) expansion card for the DRS300, providing a bitmapped graphics display with three 32 KB colour planes, offering eight distinct colours from a palette of 64 encoded using an RGB222 arrangement, along with a separate text plane offering eight foreground and eight background colours from the 64-colour palette and a redefinable character font. The display memory was exposed via a 32 KB region in the address space of the 80286 processor, requiring the selection of a single plane at any one point in time. The card provided a resolution of 640 x 400 pixels with a 60 Hz refresh rate in conjunction with ICL's Model 307 monitor. ICL supported Digital Research's Graphics Environment Manager on this configuration which was aimed at "management graphics", this including activities such as the preparation of graphs and charts, and of presentations on displays and transparencies. ICL claimed that such a system was unique in having high-resolution graphics, multi-user capabilities and on-board networking.

The initial DRS 300 also ran ICL's implementation of Unix System V Release 2, DRS/NX V2, though that was never released commercially. Later an 80386 (A4) module was added, to run a 32-bit DRS/NX V3, based on System V Release 3.

== DRS 400, DRS 500 ==
These brand names were applied to bought-in Unix boxes. The DRS 400 originated as the Clan 4, based on the Motorola 68020 running UniSoft's Uniplus Unix. This was later replaced by the DRS 400E, based on the Motorola 68030 running DRS/NX V3. DRS 500 originated as the Clan 5, 6 and 7 based on the CCI Power 6/32. This was built in Irvine by CCI, which had been taken over by ICL's parent STC PLC. CCI was also the source of what became ICL's flagship OfficePower office application suite across the DRS range.

== DRS 75 ==
The DRS 75 was a 25 MHz 80486 personal computer with PC AT bus built by Acer, capable of running MS-DOS 3.3 and 4.01, OS/2 and SCO Unix.

== DRS 95, DRS 3000 ==
The DRS 95 and DRS 3000 were IBM-compatible, 80486-based, floor-standing models, the DRS 95 running LAN Manager OS/2 or NetWare and introduced in July 1990, and the DRS 3000 running SVR4 and introduced later that year. These models largely replaced the earlier DRS 300 and DRS 400 models and were manufactured for ICL by Acer. The P5 Pentium-based Level 656 was launched in September 1993.

== DRS 6000 ==
The DRS 6000 was the result of the UNICORN project, initiated in December 1987 by the newly formed Advanced Servers Product Centre in Bracknell, to design a UNIX product for manufacture at ICL's facility in Ashton that would combine state-of-the-art technology with adherence to recognised open standards. This product was launched in January 1990 as a multiprocessor-capable SPARC-based server, running ICL's implementation of Unix System V Release 4 (SVR4). It replaced the DRS 500 models in ICL's line-up, with two models available at launch: the Level 40 with 25 MHz CPU and 16 MB of RAM fitted, and the Level 50 with 33 MHz CPU and 32 MB of RAM fitted.

Featuring one to four SPARC processors, up to 512 MB of RAM, 760 MB to 5 GB of storage in a single cabinet, or up to 15 GB with expansion cabinets, the DRS 6000 utilised the industry standard 32-bit VMEbus for input/output and a proprietary 64-bit HSPbus (High Speed Private bus) interfacing CPU Modules to main memory, each module providing a processor chipset and accompanying cache memory. Input/output controllers situated on the VMEbus were also interfaced to main memory via a cache situated in the Central Services Module linking the two buses. The HSPbus employed "hardware snoop" or "bus watching" logic to support cache coherency.

The CPU Module was "targeted at a particular implementation of the SPARC microprocessor", running at 33 MHz, involving an "integer unit" with a stated performance rating of 15-20 MIPS, accompanied by a floating-point coprocessor. Due to timing constraints, accesses to cache memory were not translated by a memory management unit (MMU), this being a separate component, and thus 32-bit virtual addresses were used with the cache, these being augmented by a 16-bit context number to identify distinct tasks or address spaces. Physical addresses were generated by the MMU for the HSPbus, and these addresses were employed by the "snoop unit" to recreate virtual addresses and to update the cache when bus traffic occurred that involved the modification of a particular memory region.

As a VMEbus controller, the Central Services Module board employed a 68020 processor, leading to sarcastic comments in the press that it was a DRS 400 in disguise.

In 1991, ICL released the first multiprocessor models in the range: the DRS 6000 Level 65 and Level 70, with the latter featuring 40 MHz processors. By 1992 there were desktop, slimline and full sized models, ranging from a single-processor desktop model rated at 29 MIPS (240) to a 4-processor model rated at 116 MIPS (644), ICL having dropped the "Level" designation and employing a three-digit model numbering scheme. Initial pricing of the four-processor models was projected at around $150,000 prior to their introduction. The four-processor 644 model was introduced at a price of £85,750 or around $150,498. Some models were sold by Fujitsu as the DS/90. ICL received the Queen's Award for Export Achievement for DRS 6000 in 1993.

The DRS 6000 competed directly with IBM's RS/6000, which was launched a few weeks later; originally planned to be called the DRS 600 it was renamed when it was found that IBM had decided on the RS 6000.

In 1993, ICL upgraded the DRS 6000 300 series with a 40 MHz SuperSPARC processor, introducing DRS/NX Version 7.0, an implementation of Unix System V Release 4.2. This version of DRS/NX was XPG4-compliant, supported OSF/Motif and OPEN LOOK graphical user interfaces, and promised compatibility with Solaris 2 applications. It was available for both SPARC and x86 platforms, marketed as a distinct product, with pricing for the latter being announced from $500.00 up to $1,600.

In 1994, the DRS range was superseded by the SuperServer (Ks (SPARC) and Ki (Intel)) and TeamServer (Es (1-2 SPARC CPUs), Hs (2-4 SPARC CPUs), Ei (1 x86 CPU), Hi (2 x86 CPUs)) ranges of SPARC and Intel-based machines, running DRS/NX Unix or Microsoft Windows NT.

- DRS 6000 Level 200 Series
- DRS 6000 Level 600 Series

== DRS PWS ==
In 1987, the DRS Professional Work Station (PWS) was ICL's first foray into IBM PC/AT compatible computing. The DRS PWS was initially released with MS-DOS 4.0 (not to be confused with the later public releases of IBM DOS 4.0 in July 1988 and MS-DOS 4.01 in November 1988). This was a real-mode pre-emptive multitasking version, developed from MS-DOS 2.0 and was also the forerunner of OS/2. It was soon replaced with MS-DOS 4.1 when this became available; this was written especially for the DRS PWS, but was not finished for the launch. Microsoft agreed to write a custom version of MS-DOS 4.0 for ICL that would take advantage of the extra memory on the ICL computers. As a consequence, PWS users had a number of software compatibility challenges, although the PC Business Unit (PCBU) at ICL BRA04, in Bracknell, did patch some applications for larger customers. The ICL/MS-DOS 4.00 Multitasking operating system on the ICL M60 machines has support for MS-WINDOWS 1.03. The ICL/MS-DOS 4.10 Multitasking operating system on the ICL M60/M80 machines has support for MS-WINDOWS 1.xx and MS-WINDOWS 2.xx, including MS-WINDOWS 2.xx 286/386 in 8086 mode.

The PWS was positioned to compete with the IBM Personal System/2 (PS/2) and the DEC Vaxstation 2000. In 1988, the DRS PWS and DRS PWS 386 were respectively rebranded as the DRS Model 60 and DRS Model 80.

The PWS hardware was a large desktop or floor standing tower chassis, running on an Intel 8 MHz 80286 processor that was later superseded by an Intel 20 MHz 80386 (DRS PWS 386). Memory expansion was via proprietary cards (1 MB or 4 MB cards, 16 MB total) and initially there was no support for 1.44 MB High Density (HD) floppy drives, although a hardware modification to the clock lines on the floppy disk controller meant that later versions of the PWS could be upgraded. The NGA or ENGA (CGA or EGA compatible network video) controllers, displayed standard CGA or EGA graphics and text with an additional line reserved on the bottom row for multitasking and communications task messages.

The PWS was capable of communicating with ICL departmental and mainframe services using a combination of Microlan2 and OSLAN (Open Systems Local Area Network) protocols. Microsoft and OSLAN network connectivity was supported via BICC OSLAN cards (OSLAN being ICL's implementation of OSI transport protocols over Ethernet). TCP/IP and DECnet support was implemented by third parties using packet drivers, as NDIS was not available at this time.

== Development software ==
Languages on DRS 20 under DRX included Microsoft BASIC, Micro Focus CIS-COBOL, Pascal, 8085 Assembler, and application building packages including Userbuild and the Demon suite.

Languages on DRS 300 Concurrent DOS included Lattice C, CBASIC, Micro Focus Level II COBOL and Digital Research languages including FORTRAN and Pascal.

Development software on the Unix-based DRS ranges (300 to 6000) included C, Micro Focus and RM COBOL, EPC C++, FORTRAN and Pascal, and relational databases including Ingres, Informix, Oracle, Sybase and Progress 4GL supplied by Progress Software.

During this period, ICL's software strategy was increasingly to make available on its own hardware popular software packages developed by third parties. Almost invariably this involved porting the source code, as there was insufficient compatibility between machines at the binary level. In order to reduce the cost of this activity, and the commercial disadvantage of not having as large a software portfolio as rival vendors, ICL invested strenuous efforts to improve cross-industry compatibility through initiatives such as X/Open.
