= DX10 =

- Developer: Texas Instruments
- Latest release: 3.7.0
- Marketing target: Small Business, process control and factory automation applications
- Supported platforms: TI 990/10, 990/10A and 990/12 minicomputers

DX10 was a general purpose international, multitasking operating system designed to operate with the Texas Instruments 990/10, 990/10A and 990/12 minicomputers using the memory mapping feature.

== The Disk Executive Operating System (DX10) ==
DX10 was a versatile disk-based operating system capable of supporting a wide range of commercial and industrial applications. DX10 was also a multiterminal system capable of making each of several users appear to have exclusive control of the system.

DX10 was an international operating system designed to meet the commercial requirements of the United States, most European countries, and Japan. DX10 supported several models of video display terminals (VDTs), most of which permit users to enter, view, and process data in their own language.

== DX10 Capabilities ==
DX10 required a basic hardware configuration, but allows additional members of an extensive group of peripherals to be included in the configuration. During system generation, the user could configure DX10 to support peripheral devices that are not members of the 990 family and devices that require realtime support. This capability required that the user also provide software control for these devices.

The user communicated with DX10 easily through the System Command Interpreter (SCI). SCI was designed to provide simple, convenient interaction between the user and DX10 in a conversational format. Through SCI the user had access to complete control of DX10. SCI was flexible in its mode of communication. While SCI is convenient for interactive communication through a data terminal, SCI can be accessed in batch mode as well.

DX10 was capable of extensive file management. The built-in file structures include key indexed files, relative record files, and sequential files. A group of file control utilities exists for copying and modifying files, and controlling file parameters.

== DX10 Features ==
DX10 offered a number of features that provide convenient use of the minicomputers system capabilities:

- Easy system generation for systems with custom device configurations. With proper preparation, peripheral devices that are not part of the 990 computer family can be interfaced through DX10.
- A macro assembler for translating assembly language programs into executable machine code.
- A text editor for entering source code or data into accessible files.
- Support of high-level languages, including Fortran, COBOL, Pascal, RPG II, and BASIC.
- A link editor and extended debugging facilities are provided to further support program development.
