= PDP-8 4K Disk Monitor System =

Early computer operating system

8K DMS
- Developer: Digital Equipment Corporation
- Written in: PAL-D, FORTRAN-D, FOCAL
- Working state: Discontinued
- Source model: Closed source
- Supported platforms: PDP-8
- Default user interface: Command-line interface
- License: Proprietary

The PDP-8 Disk Monitor is a discontinued operating system released by Digital Equipment Corporation for their PDP-8 line of mini-computers. The minimum hardware requirements consisted of a ASR 33 teletype, 3 cycle data break (an option on the PDP-8/S model), and a mass storage option of a DF32 disk sub-system or a TC01 DECtape unit, with later releases the additional option of using a RF08 disk drive. The distribution media was on paper tape, a common means of data storage for computers of that era. The included user programs consisted mainly of modified versions of the paper tape software library distributed by DEC for their PDP-8 family of small computers, much of this was exported to the TSS-8 and MS/8 operating systems.

A modified version of this monitor was used on "8K or larger PDP 8/E" systems, with one of its claimed benefits being that it made better use of additional DECtape drives than OS/8.
