= TI-990 =

Series of 16-bit computers by Texas Instruments

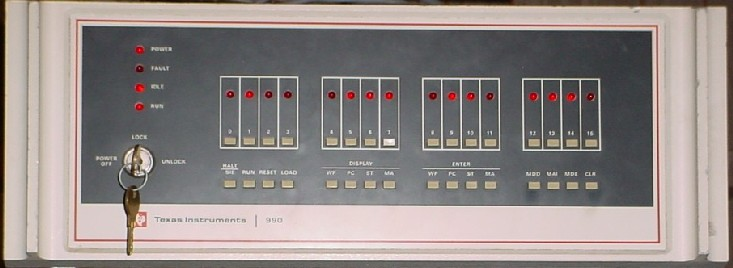
TI-990 programmers panel

The TI-990 is a series of 16-bit minicomputers sold by Texas Instruments (TI) in the 1970s and 1980s. It served as a replacement for TI's earlier minicomputer systems, the TI-960 and the TI-980. The TI-990 features several unique innovations and was designed to be easier to program than its predecessors.

Among its core concepts is the ability to support multiprogramming using a software-switchable set of processor registers that allowed it to perform rapid context switches between programs. This is enabled through the use of register values stored in main memory that could be swapped by changing a single pointer.

TI later implemented the TI-990 in a single chip, the TMS9900, one of the first 16-bit microprocessors. Intended for use in low-end models of the TI-990, it retained the 990's memory-to-memory architecture. This chip was widely used in the TI-99/4A home computer, where aggressive cost-cutting measures presented significant performance disadvantages.

== TI-990 models ==
The TI-990 processors fell into several natural groups depending on the original design upon which they are based and which I/O bus they used.

All models support the Communications Register Unit (CRU) which is a serial bit addressable I/O bus. Also, supported on higher end models is the TILINE I/O bus which is similar to DEC's popular UNIBUS. The TILINE also supports a master/slave relationship that allowed multiple CPU boards in a common chassis with arbitration control.

=== CRU-only models ===
The following models used the CRU as their principal bus:

- TI-990/9 — The original TTL implementation; 1974
- TI-990/4 — TMS9900 microprocessor with 56 KB of memory

=== TILINE/CRU models ===
The following models used the TILINE as their principal mass storage bus:

- TI-990/5 — TMS9900 microprocessor with 64 KB of memory
- TI-990/10 — TTL processor with memory mapping support to 2 MB of ECC memory; 1975
- TI-990/10A — TMS99000 microprocessor with memory mapping support to 1 MB of memory
- TI-990/12 — Schottky TTL processor with memory mapping to 2 MB of ECC Memory, workspace caching, hardware floating point, extended mode instructions and writeable control store

== Features ==
=== Orthogonal instruction set ===
The TI-990 series has a fairly orthogonal instruction set. The instruction formats allows for one-, two- and three-word instructions. The model 990/12 CPU allows for a four- word instruction with extended mode operations.

=== Workspaces ===
In the TI-990 series, the general-purpose registers are stored in memory and are referred to through a hardware register called the Workspace Pointer. The concept behind the workspace is that main memory was based on the new semiconductor RAM chips that TI had developed and ran at the same speed as the CPU. This meant that it didn't matter if the "registers" were real registers in the CPU or stored in memory. When the Workspace Pointer is loaded with a memory address, that address is the origin of the registers.

There are only three hardware registers in the 990: the Workspace Pointer (WP), the Program Counter (PC) and the Status register (ST). A context switch entailed the saving and restoring of only the hardware registers.

== Architectural details ==
Addresses are 16-bit byte addresses, so the address space is 2^{16} bytes (65,536 bytes or 32,768 words) large. The byte ordering in words is big endian.

There is no dedicated stack pointer register. Instead, branch instructions exist that save the program counter to a register (BL — Branch and Link), or change the register context (BLWP — Branch and Link Workspace Pointer, or XOP). The 16 hardware and 16 software interrupt vectors each consist of a pair of PC and WP values, so the register context switch is automatically performed by an interrupt as well. Stacks can be implemented atop either of these mechanisms.

Along with the typical single-bit flags seen in most processors, the status register contains a 4-bit interrupt mask. The value, 0 to 15, indicates the maximum interrupt that can be triggered. For instance, if interrupt 10 has been called, and interrupt 12 is triggered, the CPU checks this values, sees that 10 is running, and blocks the request.

TI-990 hardware registers
| ^{0}_{0} | ^{0}_{1} | ^{0}_{2} | ^{0}_{3} | ^{0}_{4} | ^{0}_{5} | ^{0}_{6} | ^{0}_{7} | ^{0}_{8} | ^{0}_{9} | ^{1}_{0} | ^{1}_{1} | ^{1}_{2} | ^{1}_{3} | ^{1}_{4} | ^{1}_{5} | (bit position) |
| PC | | | | | | | | | | | | | | | 0 | Program Counter |
| WP | | | | | | | | | | | | | | | 0 | Workspace Pointer |
| L> | A> | EQ | C | O | P | X | PR | MF | MM | OI | CS | Int Mask | | | | Status Register |

There are 16 general-purpose "workspace registers". Several registers have defined purposes in many instructions. These are:

- R0 - shift counter, extended mode counter, Floating point Accumulator (FAC) most significant word
- R1 - FAC+2 (single precision)
- R2 - FAC+4 (double precision)
- R3 - FAC+6 (double precision)
- R11 - return linkage, or pointer to operand of XOP (privileged mode)
- R12 - CRU base address (privileged mode)
- R13 - Saved Workspace Pointer
- R14 - Saved Program Counter
- R15 - Saved Status Register

=== Addressing modes ===
Most instruction operands are represented with an addressing mode and a general-purpose register used by that addressing mode. In these examples, Rn is a general-purpose register, 0 to 15. The addressing modes are:

| Code | Name | Example | Description |
|---|---|---|---|
| 0n | Register | Rn | The operand is in Rn |
| 1n | Indirect register | *Rn | Rn contains the address of the operand |
| 2n | Indexed | @mem(Rn) | Rn contains an index value to add to address mem, forming the address of the operand |
| 20 | Symbolic | mem | If Rn is R0, direct memory addressing is specified. The address mem is used as the address of the operand. |
| 3n | Indirect autoincrement | *Rn+ | Rn contains the address of the operand, then increment Rn by data size |

=== Instructions ===
The 990/9, 990/4, and 990/5 instruction sets consisted of 69 instructions, the 990/10 had 72 instructions, the 990/10A had 77 instructions, and the 990/12 had 144 instructions.

For subroutine calls, the Branch and Load Workspace Pointer (BLWP) instruction loads new WP and PC values, then saves the values of WP, PC, and ST to (new) registers 13, 14, and 15 respectively. At the end of the subroutine, the Return Workspace Pointer (RTWP) restores these in reverse order. Using BLWP/RTWP, it is possible to nest subroutine calls despite the absence of a stack, however, the programmer needs to assign the appropriate register workspace explicitly.

The instruction set also contains a Branch and Link (BL) opcode that only saves PC to register 11 without changing WP. In this case, a branch instruction (B) using WR11 as the destination address can serve as the return opcode, but BL-type subroutines cannot be nested without the programmer taking actions to save the return address.

Then execute instruction "X" (eXecute) executes the instruction in a register or memory location. It can be used for debugging (as a breakpoint instruction), for creating indexed-opcode tables as used in byte-code interpreters and can also be used to perform a time critical I/O instruction during an interrupt. An example of its utility is shown in the code below where an interrupt is being serviced in a very encapsulated manner that would otherwise require many more instructions.

;***********************************
;
;	THIS INTERRUPT SIMULATES DMA CONTROL
;	ORGANISED AS FOLLOWS:
;
; R9 HOLDS CURRENT COMMAND, E.G.
;   IOREAD(34B8H): STCR	*R8+,BYTEWIDE	;BYTE WIDE FDC DATA READ
;   IOWRITE(30B8H):LDCR	*R8+,BYTEWIDE	;BYTE WIDE FDC DATA WRITE
; R8 HOLDS THE CURRENT DMA ADDRESS.
; R12 HOLDS THE CURRENT IO PORT - DATREG
;************************************
INTDRQ	X	R9	;CAN BE EITHER READ or WRITE 
        RTWP

This common piece of code during the interrupt could be used by both I/O read and write commands. Similar methods could be employed in any debugging methods wanting to be used.

TI-990 series processors also support the eXtended OPeration (XOP) instruction. XOP is given a number in the range 0–15 as well as a source address. When invoked, the instruction will perform a context switch through one of sixteen vectors at predefined locations in memory. The XOP instruction also places the effective address of the source operand in register R11 of the new workspace. The context-saving feature of the XOP instruction can also be used as to implement inline debugging.

XOP is less flexible than a BLWP, as the transfer vectors have to be at fixed locations, but allows one source operand to be directly addressed rather than passed in a register or otherwise.

XOP can be used to implement a system call facility. In TI's DX10 operating system, XOP 15 invokes a system call. A programmer might define an assembler macro, for example SVC, which invokes XOP 15. Another use of XOP was to implement instructions in software which might be handled by dedicated hardware in future versions of the 990 minicomputer series. An example of such actions can be shown in the code below where a CALL function is implemented using and XOP 6 instruction. The beauty of this implementation of a CALL function using an XOP is that it is straightforward to add checks to determine if the stack overflowed, for example C R10,@2*R9(R13), where R9 points to the address of the stack limit.

 ;
 ;************************************************
 ;  CALL SUBROUTINE
 ;  DEFINE XOP:  DXOP  CALL,6
 ;  CALLING METHOD:   CALL @SUBROUTINE_ADDRESS
 ;  R10 <=> STACK POINTER
 ;*************************************************
 ;
  ED32   C2AD 0014      XOP6: MOV  @2*R10(R13),R10   ;GET STACK POINTER
  ED36   064A                 DECT R10               ;DECREMENT STACK POINTER
  ED38   C68E          	      MOV  R14,*R10          ;PUSH RETURN PC ONTO STACK
  ED3A   C38B                 MOV  R11,R14           ;MOVE EA INTO R14 (PC) FOR CALL
  ED3C   CB4A 0014     	      MOV  R10,@2*R10(R13)   ;UPDATE STACK POINTER
  ED40   0380                 RTWP                   ;WE ARE NOW USING THE ORIGINAL WP

The 990/10 has a facility to allow specific XOP codes to use plug-in hardware. If the hardware is not present, the regular XOP trap is performed. This allowed for 15 attached devices on a system, although, device 15 is reserved in TI's operating systems for the Supervisor Call (SVC), through which user programs requested I/O and other operating systems services.

On the 990/12, if the writable control store is enabled, the XOP instruction would jump to microcode in the writable control store.

The instructions are grouped according to the instruction format. A format is defined by the layout of bit fields within the instruction word. The leftmost bits of the instruction word are sufficient to identify its format.

Format 1 instructions

These are two-operand move, arithmetic, and comparison instructions. The first field of the word is a 4-bit operation code. The remaining four fields are a 2-bit addressing mode and 4-bit register number for the destination operand and a 2-bit addressing mode and 4-bit register number for the source operand. This format takes up 75% of available opcodes.

| 0 | 2 | 3 | 4 | 5 | 6 | 9 | 10 | 11 | 12 | 15 |
| Opcode | | B | T_{D} | | D | | T_{S} | | S |

- MOV (move word)
- MOVB (move byte)
- A (add word)
- AB (add byte)
- S (subtract word)
- SB (subtract byte)
- C (compare word)
- CB (compare byte)
- SZC (set zeros corresponding word)
- SZCB (set zeros corresponding byte)
- SOC (set ones corresponding word)
- SOCB (set ones corresponding byte)
Format 2 instructions

These operands are jump and CRU bit-manipulation instructions. The first field of the word is an 8-bit operation code. The second field is an 8-bit PC-relative offset to where to go for jump instructions or the relative offset for CRU bit addressing.

| 0 | 7 | 8 | 15 |
| Opcode | | Offset |

- JMP (jump unconditionally)
- JLT (jump if less than zero)
- JLE (jump if less than or equal to zero)
- JEQ (jump if zero)
- JHE (jump if logically greater than or equal to zero)
- JGT (jump if greater than zero)
- JNE (jump if not equal zero)
- JNC (jump if carry clear)
- JOC (jump if carry set)
- JNO (jump if overflow clear)
- JOP (jump if odd parity - only relevant after byte operations)
- JL (jump if logically less than zero)
- JH (jump if logically greater than zero)
- SBO (set CRU bit to one)
- SBZ (set CRU bit to zero)
- TB (test CRU bit)
Format 3 instructions

The first field of the word is a 6-bit operation code. The second field is a 4-bit destination register number, and the third and fourth fields are a 2-bit addressing mode and 4-bit register number.

| 0 | 5 | 6 | 9 | 10 | 11 | 12 | 15 |
| Opcode | | D | | T_{S} | | S |

- COC (compare ones corresponding)
- CZC (compare zeros corresponding)
- XOR (exclusive or)
Format 4 instructions

These instructions transfer a specified number of bits between the CRU and a register. The first field of the word is a 6-bit operation code. The second field is a 4-bit field that specifies the bit width of the operation, and the third and fourth fields are a 2-bit addressing mode and 4-bit register number.

| 0 | 5 | 6 | 9 | 10 | 11 | 12 | 15 |
| Opcode | | C | | T_{S} | | S |

- LDCR (load CRU)
- STCR (store CRU)
Format 5 instructions

These are shift instructions. The first field of the word is an 8-bit operation code. The second field is a 4-bit shift count and the third field is a 4-bit register number that specifies the register to shift.

| 0 | 7 | 8 | 11 | 12 | 15 |
| Opcode | | C | | W |

- SRA (shift right arithmetic)
- SRL (shift right logical)
- SLA (shift left arithmetic)
- SRC (shift right circular)
Format 6 instructions

These are single-operand instructions. The first field is a 10-bit operation code. The second and third fields are a 2-bit addressing mode and 4-bit register number that specify the operand.

| 0 | 9 | 10 | 11 | 12 | 15 |
| Opcode | | T_{S} | | S |

- BLWP (branch and load workspace pointer)
- B (branch)
- X (execute)
- CLR (clear word)
- NEG (twos complement negate)
- INV (ones complement)
- INC (increment)
- INCT (increment by two)
- DEC (decrement)
- DECT (decrement by two)
- BL (branch and link)
- ABS (absolute value)
- SWPB (swap bytes)
- SETO (set word to ones)
- LDS (long distance source, 990/10, 990/10A, 990/12)
- LDD (long-distance destination, 990/10, 990/10A, 990/12)
- BIND (branch indirect, 990/10A, 990/12)
- MPYS (multiply signed, 990/10A, 990/12)
- DIVS (divide signed, 990/10A, 990/12)
- AR (add real, 990/12)
- CIR (convert integer to real, 990/12)
- SR (subtract real, 990/12)
- MR (multiply real, 990/12)
- DR (divide real, 990/12)
- LR (load real, 990/12)
- STR (store real, 990/12)
- AD (add double, 990/12)
- CID (convert integer to double, 990/12)
- SD (subtract double, 990/12)
- MD (multiply double, 990/12)
- DD (divide double, 990/12)
- LD (load double, 990/12)
- STD (store double, 990/12)
Format 7 instructions

These instructions do not specify an operand. The first field is an 11-bit operation code. The remaining 5 bits are not used.

| 0 | 10 | 11 | 15 |
| Opcode | | N |

- IDLE (cpu idle)
- RSET (cpu reset)
- RTWP (return workspace pointer)
- CKON (clock on)
- CKOF (clock off)
- LREX (load ROM and execute/load or restart execution)
- EMD (execute micro diagnostic, 990/12)
- EINT (enable interrupt, 990/12)
- DINT (disable interrupt, 990/12)
- CRI (convert real to integer, 990/12)
- CDI (convert double to integer, 990/12)
- NEGR (negate real, 990/12)
- NEGD (negate double, 990/12)
- CRE (convert real to extended integer, 990/12)
- CDE (convert double to extended integer, 990/12)
- CER (convert extended integer to real, 990/12)
- CED (convert extended integer to double, 990/12)
- XIT (exit floating point, 990/12)
Format 8 instructions

These instructions operate on a register and an immediate operand. The first field is an 11-bit operation code. The second field specifies the register if applicable. The third field, if applicable, specifies an immediate operand in a second word.

| 0 | 10 | 11 | 15 |
| Opcode | | N |
IOP

- LIMI (load interrupt mask immediate)
- LWPI (load workspace pointer immediate)

| 0 | 10 | 11 | 12 | 15 |
| Opcode | | N | W |
IOP

- LI (load immediate)
- AI (add immediate)
- ANDI (and immediate)
- ORI (or immediate)
- CI (compare immediate)
- BLSK (branch immediate push link onto stack, 990/12)

| 0 | 10 | 11 | 12 | 15 |
| Opcode | | N | W |

- STWP (store workspace pointer)
- STST (store status)
Format 9 instructions

These instructions either perform an extended operation or an arithmetic operation. For extended operations, XOP, the first field of the word is a 6-bit operation code, the second field is a 4-bit field specifying the extended operation, and the third and fourth fields are a 2-bit addressing mode and 4-bit register number that specify the operand. For arithmetic operations, the first field of the word is a 6-bit operation code, the second field is a 4-bit field containing a register number specifying the destination, and the third and fourth fields are a 2-bit addressing mode and 4-bit register number that specify the source.

| 0 | 5 | 6 | 9 | 10 | 11 | 12 | 15 |
| Opcode | | D | | T_{S} | | S |

- XOP (extended operation)
- MPY (unsigned multiply)
- DIV (unsigned divide)
Format 10 instruction

These instructions load the memory map file. The first field is an 11-bit operation code. The second field is a 1-bit field that specifies the map file (0=kernel, 1=user) and the third field is a 4-bit field that specifies a register with an address.

The given map file is loaded with six words from the address in the register.

This instruction is supported on the 990/10A and 990/12, or the 990/10 with memory-map option installed.

| 0 | 10 | 11 | 12 | 15 |
| Opcode | | M | W |

- LMF (load map file)
Format 11 instructions

These instructions operate on multi-byte operands. The first word is the operation code. IN the second word, the first field is a 4-bit byte count field, the second and third fields are a 2-bit addressing mode and 4-bit register number that specify the destination operand and the fourth and fifth fields are a 2-bit addressing mode and 4-bit register number that specify the source operand. These instructions are supported on the 990/12.

- NRM (normalize)
- RTO (right test for ones)
- LTO (left test for ones)
- CNTO (count ones)
- BDC (binary to decimal conversion)
- DBC (decimal to binary conversion)
- SWPM (swap multiple)
- XORM (xor multiple)
- ORM (or multiple)
- ANDM (and multiple)
- SM (subtract multiple)
- AM (add multiple)

The multiple precision instructions allowed for logic and integer arithmetic on operands from 1-15 bytes long. *SM and *AM are supported on the 990/10A.

Format 12 instructions

These are character string instructions. The first field of the first word is a 12-bit operation code. The second field of the first word is a 12-bit register number indicates a checkpoint register, which is used in a machine-dependent fashion. The first field of the second word is a 4-bit byte count field, the second and third fields are a 2-bit addressing mode and 4-bit register number that specify the destination operand and the fourth and fifth fields are a 2-bit addressing mode and 4-bit register number that specify the source operand. These instructions are supported on the 990/12.

- SNEB (search string for not equal byte)
- CRC (cyclic redundancy code calculation)
- TS (translate string)
- CS (compare string)
- SEQB (search string for equal byte)
- MOVS (move string)
- MVSR (move string reversed)
- MVSK (move string from stack)
- POPS (pop string from stack)
- PSHS (push string to stack)
Format 13 instructions

These are multi-byte bit-shift instructions. The first word is the operation code. In the second word, the first field is a 4-bit byte count, the second field is a 4-bit shift count, and the third and fourth fields are a 2-bit addressing mode and 4-bit register number that specify the operand. These instructions are supported on the 990/12 and 990/10A.

- SRAM (shift right arithmetic multiple)
- SLAM (shift left arithmetic multiple)
Format 14 instructions

These instructions test one of 2048 bits in a multi-byte operand. The first word is the operation code. The first field of the second word is an 11-bit field that specifies the bit to test and the second and third fields are a 2-bit addressing mode and 4-bit register number that specify the source operand. These instructions are supported on the 990/12.

- TMB (test memory bit)
- TCMB (test and clear memory bit)
- TSMB (test and set memory bit)
Format 15 instruction

This instruction reverses the order of bits within a bit field of a multi-byte operand. The first field of the first word is a 12-bit operation code. The second field of the first word is a 4-bit field that specifies the width of the bit field. The first field of the second word is a 4-bit field that specifies the bit position of the bit field, and the second and third fields are a 2-bit addressing mode and 4-bit register number that specify the source operand. This instruction is supported on the 990/12.

- IOF (invert order of field)
Format 16 instructions

These instructions extract bit fields from or insert bit fields into a multi-byte operand. The first field of the first word is a 12-bit operation code. The second field of the first word is a 4-bit field that specifies the width of the bit field. TThe first field of the second word is a 4-bit field that specifies the bit position of the bit field, the second and third fields are a 2-bit addressing mode and 4-bit register number that specify the destination operand, and the fourth and fifth fields are a 2-bit addressing mode and 4-bit register number that specify the source operand. These instructions are supported on the 990/12.

- INSF (insert field)
- XV (extract value)
- XF (extract field)
Format 17 instructions

These instructions adjust the value in a register and jump to a new address. The first word is the operation code. The first field of the second word is a 4-bit value that is added to or subtracted from the register, the second field is a 4-bit field that specifies the register to be adjusted, and the third field is an 8-bit PC-relative offset for the jump target. These instructions are supported on the 990/12.

- SRJ (subtract value from register and jump)
- ARJ (add value to register and jump)
Format 18 instructions

These instructions perform an operation with a single register operand. The first field of the word is a 12-bit operation code. The second field is a 4-bit value that specify the register. These instructions are supported on the 990/12.

- STPC (store PC in register)
- LIM (load interrupt mask from register)
- LST (load status register)
- LWP (load workspace pointer)
- LCS (load control store)
Format 19 instruction

This instruction moves the effective address of the source operand to the destination operand. The first word is the operation code. The first and second fields are a 2-bit addressing mode and 4-bit register number that specify the destination operand, and the third and fourth fields are a 2-bit addressing mode and 4-bit register number that specify the source operand. This instruction is supported on the 990/12.

- MOVA (move address)
Format 20 instructions

These instructions search a list. The first word is the operation code. The first field of the second word is a 4-bit field specifying the condition to be searched for, the second and third fields are a 2-bit addressing mode and 4-bit register number that specify the destination operand, and the fourth and fifth fields are a 2-bit addressing mode and 4-bit register number that specify the source operand. These instructions are supported on the 990/12.

- SLSL (search list logical address)
- SLSP (search list physical address)
Format 21 instruction

These instructions extend the precision of a multi-byte value. The first field of the first word is a 12-bit operation code; the second field is a 4-byte value specifying the length of the destination. The first field of the second word is a 4-byte value specifying the length of the source, the second and third fields are a 2-bit addressing mode and 4-bit register number that specify the destination operand and the fourth and fifth fields are a 2-bit addressing mode and 4-bit register number that specify the source operand. This instruction is only supported on the 990/12.

- EP (extend precision)

== Assembly Language Programming Example ==
A complete "Hello, world!" program in TI-990 assembler, to run under DX10:

        IDT     'HELLO'
        TITL    'HELLO - hello world program'
*
        DXOP    SVC,15          Define SVC
TMLUNO  EQU     0               Terminal LUNO
*
R0      EQU     0
R1      EQU     1
R2      EQU     2
R3      EQU     3
R4      EQU     4
R5      EQU     5
R6      EQU     6
R7      EQU     7
R8      EQU     8
R9      EQU     9
R10     EQU     10
R11     EQU     11
R12     EQU     12
R13     EQU     13
R14     EQU     14
R15     EQU     15
*
        DATA    WP,ENTRY,0
* 
* Workspace (On the 990 we can "preload" registers)
*
WP      DATA    0               R0
        DATA    0               R1 
        DATA    >1600           R2 - End of program SVC
        DATA    >0000           R3 - Open I/O opcode
        DATA    >0B00           R4 - Write I/O opcode
        DATA    >0100           R5 - Close I/O opcode
        DATA    STRING          R6 - Message address
        DATA    STRLEN          R7 - Message length
        DATA    0               R8
        DATA    0               R9
        DATA    0               R10
        DATA    0               R11
        DATA    0               R12
        DATA    0               R13
        DATA    0               R14
        DATA    0               R15
* 
* Terminal SVC block
*
TRMSCB  BYTE    0               SVC op code (0 = I/O)
TRMERR  BYTE    0               Error code
TRMOPC  BYTE    0               I/O OP CODE
TRMLUN  BYTE    TMLUNO          LUNO
TRMFLG  DATA    0               Flags
TRMBUF  DATA    $-$             Buffer address 
TRMLRL  DATA    $-$             Logical record length
TRMCHC  DATA    $-$             Character count
* 
* Message
*
STRING  TEXT    'Hello world!'
        BYTE    >D,>A
STRLEN  EQU     $-STRING
        EVEN
        PAGE
* 
* Main program entry
*
ENTRY   MOVB    R3,@TRMOPC      Set open opcode in SCB
        SVC     @TRMSCB         Open terminal
        MOVB    @TRMERR,R0      Check for error
        JNE     EXIT
        MOVB    R4,@TRMOPC      Set write opcode
        MOV     R6,@TRMBUF      Set buffer address 
        MOV     R7,@TRMLRL      Set logical record length
        MOV     R7,@TRMCHC       and character count
        SVC     @TRMSCB         Write message
        MOVB    @TRMERR,R0      Check for error
        JNE     CLOSE
CLOSE   MOVB    R5,@TRMOPC      Set close opcode
        SVC     @TRMSCB         Close terminal
EXIT    SVC     R2              Exit program
*
        END

This program can be run on a TI-990 simulator, such as Dave Pitts's "sim990", which emulates the TI-990 and includes software kits for native operating systems (including DX10).

The following program is a standalone version that prints on the serial terminal connected to CRU address 0. It illustrates the CRU I/O and workspace linkage for the PRINT subroutine.

        IDT     'HELLO'
        TITL    'HELLO - hello world program'
*
R0      EQU     0
R1      EQU     1
R2      EQU     2
R3      EQU     3
R4      EQU     4
R5      EQU     5
R6      EQU     6
R7      EQU     7
R8      EQU     8
R9      EQU     9
R10     EQU     10
R11     EQU     11
R12     EQU     12
R13     EQU     13
R14     EQU     14
R15     EQU     15
*
* Terminal CRU bits
*
TRMCRU  EQU     >0              Terminal device address
XMIT    EQU     8
DTR     EQU     9
RTS     EQU     10
WRQ     EQU     11
RRQ     EQU     12
NSF     EQU     13
*
        PAGE
*
* Main program entry
*
ENTRY   LWPI    WP              Load our workspace pointer
        BLWP    @PRINT          Call our print routine
        DATA    STRING
        DATA    STRLEN
        IDLE
*
WP      BSS     32              Main program workspace
*
* Message
*
STRING  TEXT    'Hello world!'
        BYTE    >D,>A
STRLEN  EQU     $-STRING
        EVEN
        PAGE
*
* Print a message
*
PRINT   DATA    PRWS,PRENT
PRENT   EQU     $
        MOV     *R14+,R2        Get buffer address
        MOV     *R14+,R1        Get message length
        SBO     DTR             Enable terminal ready
        SBO     RTS
PRI010  LDCR    *R2+,8          Send out a character
        TB      WRQ             Wait until done
        JNE     $-2
        SBZ     WRQ
        DEC     R1
        JGT     PRI010
        RTWP
*
PRWS    DATA    0,0,0,0,0,0,0,0
        DATA    0,0,0,0,TRMCRU,0,0,0
*
        END     ENTRY

== Operating systems ==
Several operating systems were available for the TI-990

From TI:

- TX990/TXDS
- DX10
- DNOS Distributed Network Operating System

From third parties:

- UCSD Pascal
