= MS/8 =

Operating system for the PDP-8

- Developer: Richard F. Lary
- Working state: Discontinued
- Initial release: 1966; 59 years ago
- Available in: English
- Platforms: PDP-8
- Succeeded by: P?S/8, COS-310

MS/8 or The RL Monitor System is a discontinued computer operating system developed for the Digital Equipment Corporation PDP-8 in 1966 by Richard F. Lary.

== History ==
RL Monitor System, as it was initially called, was developed on a 4K (12-bit) PDP-8 with "a Teletype that had a paper tape reader and punch and .. a single DECtape." It was a disk oriented system, faster than its predecessor, the PDP-8 4K Disk Monitor System, with tricks to make it run quickly on DECtape based systems.

Still named RL, it was submitted to DECUS in 1970.

MS/8 was replaced by P?S/8 and COS-310.

== See also ==
- PDP-8
- Digital Equipment Corporation
