= AT&T Computer Systems =

AT&T Computer Systems is the generic name for American Telephone & Telegraph's unsuccessful attempt to compete in the computer business. In return for divesting the local Bell Operating Companies (Baby Bells), AT&T was allowed to have an unregulated division to sell computer hardware and software. The company made the 3B series computers.

== Background ==
In the early 1980s, the Bell Labs Processor Division had developed several computer ranges, primarily for internal Bell System use: the 3B20D ("D" for Duplex); the commercial simplex version 3B20S, which competed with the DEC VAX; and the 3B5 and 3B15 computers for billing and telecom switching control applications, which used the world's first 32-bit microprocessor, the Bellmac 32A.

== Formation post-divestiture ==
After divestiture of the Bell System on January 1, 1984, AT&T was required to put its computer business into a fully separated subsidiary called AT&T Information Systems (ATTIS, without the ampersand or hyphen). Software was developed in New Jersey (at Murray Hill, Summit, Holmdel, and Piscataway), and software, hardware, and system solutions were developed in Naperville and Lisle, Illinois. After a couple of years of court hearings, AT&T was allowed to pull the business back into the mainstream corporate organization, and it was renamed AT&T Data Systems Group, which had three divisions: Computer, Terminals (the Teletype Corporation of Skokie, Illinois), and Printers. AT&T Data Systems Group was announced to the public in 1991. In 1992 the Terminals division was sold to Memorex-Telex, and the Printer division, which had only bought OEM equipment from Genicom, was phased out. By the mid-1990s, this left only AT&T Computer Systems.

AT&T Computer Systems (abbreviated AT&T-CS) was the home of the UNIX System V operating system, originally developed in the Bell Labs Research Division. The important System V Interface Definition (SVID) was written, attempting to standardize the various flavors of Unix, and define the official interfaces which made up a Unix operating system. In 1988, AT&T announced its intent to buy up to a 20% stake in Sun Microsystems, a company then best known for making high-end Unix workstations. Upset at their academic-minded supplier (Bell Labs) now turned competitor (AT&T-CS), the "Gang of Seven" Unix system vendors founded the Open Software Foundation (OSF), each contributing source code from their UNIX SVR3 versions. AT&T founded the UNIX International organization as a response to the OSF. But by the late 1980s, AT&T had almost given up, sold most of its stake in Sun, spun the Unix business off as Unix System Laboratories (which was later bought by Novell), canceled its WE 32000 (aka BELLMAC) and CRISP (C Reduced Instruction Set Processor) microprocessor product lines, and just concentrated on networked server computer systems. See also Unix wars.

== 3B series computers ==
Throughout the 1980s and early 1990s, AT&T-CS produced many "firsts" in the computer world, besides the UNIX operating system itself. The 3B5 and 3B15 were the first computers to be designed with the 32-bit WE 32000 microprocessor, and the 3B15 was the first computer to run a demand-paging version of Unix. There was a project, codenamed "Alice", to develop the 3B5 into an asymmetric multiprocessor with 3 CPUs, but this was canceled in favor of the demand paging 3B15 project, and a few of the "Alice" participants left the company and went to Sequent Computer Systems.

The 3B5, 3B15, 3B20S and 3B20D line, begun in 1982, was aimed at the former AT&T subsidiaries the RBOCs. Around 70,000 units were made before production ceased at the Oklahoma City Works (a former Western Electric factory) in 1993.

Starting with ATTIS in 1984, development of a commercial version of the 3B hardware commenced. The Motorola 68010-based UNIX PC (aka the 3B1) was released in 1985, developed externally by Convergent Technologies. This product was not a success, in part due to the high margin on the machines; AT&T sold the machine for $8,000 although their cost was approximately $4,000.

The next product was the 3B2 product line, which ranged from a 3B2/200 desktop unit, to a 3B2/1000 data center system. These machines were sold with System V Release 2, and later System V Release 3. The 3B2 was the reference platform for SVR3.

== Desktops ==
The 3B2 was the first desktop supermicrocomputer (1983) with a 32-bit microprocessor and UNIX. The model 300 and 400 series were uniprocessors. The 3B2 became the official "porting base" for UNIX System V Release 3. Later versions were the first to introduce UNIX asymmetric multiprocessing (3B2/600 Falcon) and nearly symmetrical multiprocessing (3B2/1000 Galactica). The Falcon won the highly touted US Air Force Office Automation contract, initially estimated at $1.7 billion, and the largest single computer contract the Federal government had awarded at that time. It was also the first supermicrocomputer to use a first-level cache memory based on virtual addresses instead of physical addresses, which made it 80% faster than the original requirements called for.

Because the 3B5/3B15 was a large minicomputer with only 1 CPU, it was sometimes referred to as "the body without a brain". The small 3B2 had a desktop design with (supposedly) less expansion capability, but had capacity available for up to 4 CPUs, it was thus also at times referred to as "the brain without a body".

The "Companion" was developed, the first "laptop" computer to have a 32-bit CPU and UNIX. The "Alexander" system measured about 14 inches on each side square, and about 5 inches high, featured a unique stacking I/O bus for up to 8 cards, featured compressed Unix filesystems on pluggable ROM cartridges like modern gaming consoles, and used the WE 32100 microprocessor running UNIX SVR3. Both were so outrageous and ahead of their time, they were never marketed.

== Servers ==
On the large side, the 3B4000 (1986) was the first "snugly coupled" multiprocessor (the "network in a box"), containing the A-BUS which supported 16 large single-board computer (SBC) circuit panels, and featured the first SVR4 distributed UNIX kernel (codenamed "Apache", nothing to do with the open source project started in the 1990s). Although the SBCs did not share address space, the UNIX kernel was distributed across all SBCs in a single virtual image.

The StarServer E ("Enterprise" or SSE) was an Intel-based symmetric multiprocessor (SMP), introduced just after the Sequent system, making the SSE the world's second SMP UNIX system, and the first to run System V.4. It featured 4 Intel i486 CPUs. A later design (codenamed "Bigfoot") was to feature 10 Pentium CPUs, but this was never released because of the NCR deal.

AT&T-CS also introduced the world's first "PC&C" (personal computer and communication), the famous AT&T Safari laptop, the first to have a built-in modem and networking. This system used an Intel x86 microprocessor, and ran Microsoft software instead of Unix. AT&T-CS also marketed a line of desktop PCs, first using Olivetti as an OEM, later designing its own product line (codename Cascade) using OEM mainboards from Intel.

Other innovative designs which were never released included the "Starburst", a distributed Unix kernel message-passing multiprocessor with a fiber-optic switching core, and "Intercept", a unique High-Availability multiprocessor.

== Partners ==
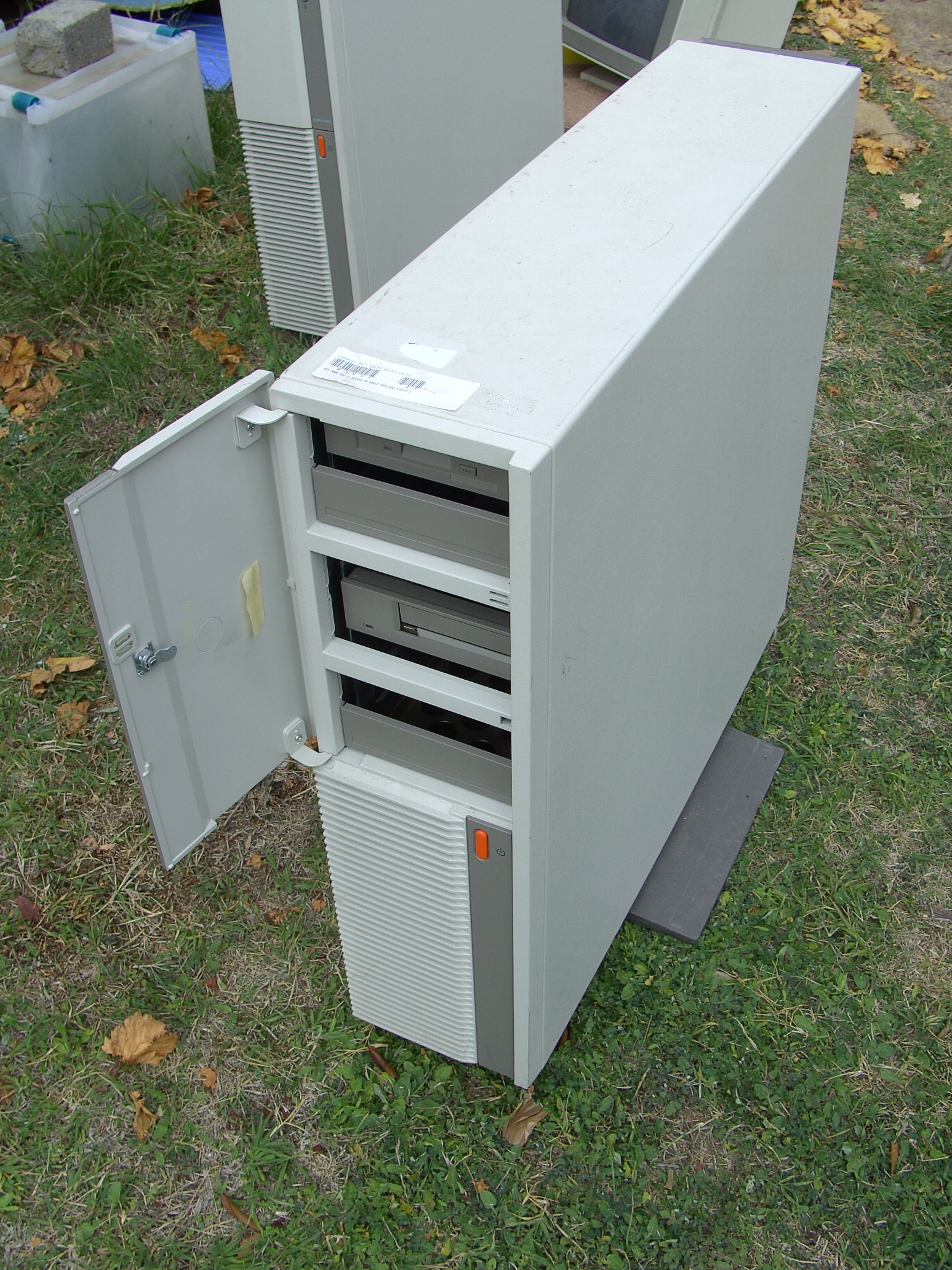
NCR 3000 (Class 3434) external view (manufactured 1989)

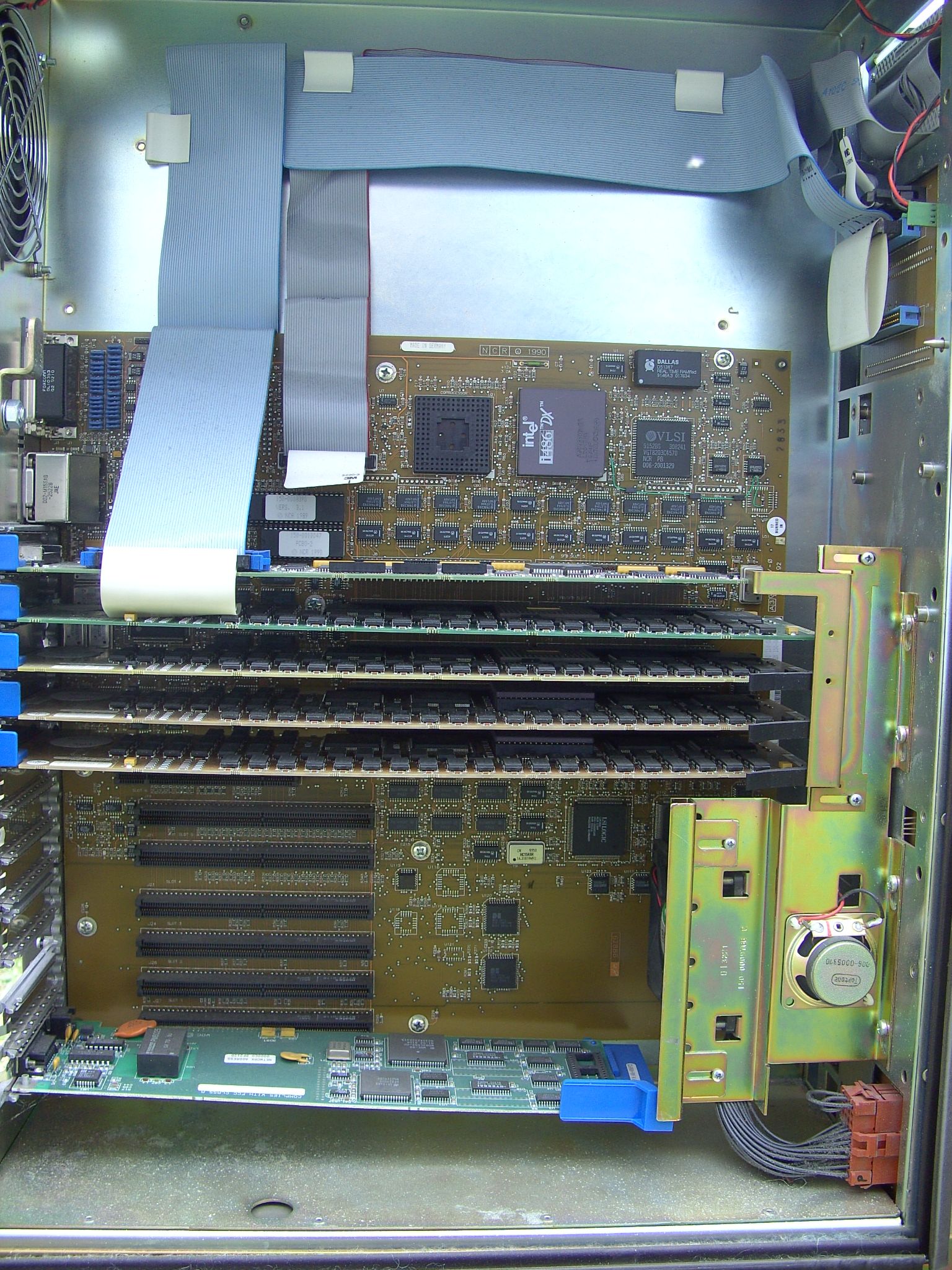
NCR 3000 (Class 3434) 80486 internal view (manufactured 1989)

AT&T-CS also bought OEM systems from Tandem Computers and Pyramid Technology. The Tandem Integrity S2 was renamed the StarServer FT and sold only internally to other AT&T divisions. The Pyramid "System 7000" was a large symmetric multiprocessor, containing 12 CPUs, and saw its first large-scale application at the AT&T Universal Cards credit-card billing center, the first enterprise-scale replacement of mainframes by a UNIX server within AT&T. Both these systems used the MIPS R-series RISC microprocessors. After the WE 32000 microprocessors were canceled, the 3B2 follow-on (codenamed "Phoenix") was also to use a MIPS CPU. The entire MIPS-based product line was to be renamed the System 9000, and to feature "scalavailability" – from normal commercial availability (NCA) choices, to fault-tolerant (FT), to high performance SMP.

The System 9000 strategy was canceled when AT&T's board of directors decided to close down AT&T-CS, and buy the NCR Corporation, announced in 1991, and implemented January 1, 1992. NCR management tried to cancel all further development of AT&T-CS systems, though some refused to allow this for a few years, and backlash from AT&T Network Systems (later to be spun off as Lucent Technologies) precipitated a purge of NCR upper management by the AT&T Board. NCR had just developed and suddenly canceled its Motorola 88000-based systems, and then started the NCR 3000 series, developed using Intel x86 microprocessors. The AT&T StarServer E could still beat the comparably equipped NCR 3450 by 11% in the TPC Benchmark B test, and some of the SSE's 7 patented innovations were then adapted and retrofitted into the NCR 3000 design.

NCR was renamed AT&T Global Information Solutions (AT&T-GIS) in 1994, and some of the top NCR management was purged. The Naperville, Illinois operation provided LifeKeeper Fault Resilient System software (a failover high-availability software cluster product), the Distributed lock manager for Oracle Parallel Server, and the Vistium computer-telephony integrated (CTI) on-line hardware-assisted networked meeting product. Only about 400 employees remained in the Naperville location by the beginning of 1995. In the mid-1980s, there had been about 30,000 employees associated with AT&T-CS, including marketing, customer support, factories, and development.

In 1994, a high powered team from AT&T Naperville transferred to NCR San Diego (California) in the midst of developing a Micro Channel architecture based four channel SCSI adapter based on a custom ASIC. This host bus adapter was successful in NCR and served as a connection point for over a billion dollars' worth of peripherals attached to NCR minicomputers and database servers.

On September 20, 1995, Bob Allen, AT&T Chairman of the Board and CEO, announced the "trivestiture" – the 3-way split of AT&T into the new service-oriented AT&T, a newly independent NCR, and the new telecom equipment business which would later be named Lucent Technologies. On December 15, the former AT&T-CS operations were shut down, signaling the end of AT&T's involvement in designing computer systems. Three AT&T-CS employees went into the new NCR, 25 stayed with AT&T, and the rest (about 200) went to Lucent. Many former AT&T-CS employees were employed by Schaumburg, Illinois-based Motorola.

== See also ==
- 3B series computers
- DMERT operating system
- J. O. Becker, The 3B20D PROCESSOR and DMERT Operating System (The Bell System Technical Journal, January 1983, Vol. 62, No. 1, Part 1)
