= No. 4 Electronic Switching System =

Telephone switching system

The No. 4 Electronic Switching System (4ESS) is a class 4 telephone electronic switching system that was the first digital electronic toll switch introduced by Western Electric for long-distance switching. It was introduced in Chicago in January 1976, to replace the 4A crossbar switch. The last of the 145 systems in the AT&T network was installed in 1999 in Atlanta. Approximately half of the switches were manufactured in Lisle, Illinois, and the other half in Oklahoma City, Oklahoma. At the time of the Bell System divestiture, most of the 4ESS switches became assets of AT&T as part of the long-distance network, while others remained in the RBOC networks. As of early 2026 there are no longer any traditional 4ESS tandem switches in the network. The remaining Class 4 tandems are now all Next Generation 4ESS (N4E).

== System architecture ==
The 4ESS Switch is often considered as a switching network and its controlling processor. The major functional equipment areas include:

- 1B processor, the 4ESS primary controlling processor
- 3B computer and associated attached processor system, which provides disk storage and additional functions
- CNI ring, a group of peripheral processors serially interconnected with each other in a dual ring configuration, and a 3B20D processor that functions in a distributed input/output processing architecture.
- Terminal equipment provides the interface between metallic trunk facilities in the toll network and the 4ESS Switch. Two-wire and 4-wire voice-frequency trunks terminating at metallic terminal facilities and equipment which provides an interface between digital carrier equipment and the 4ESS switching network.
- The switching network contains the equipment which actually switches pulse code modulated data from one trunk or service circuit to another. The switching network also contains timing equipment that generates the precise timing signals required to switch traffic. The switching network is also used to connect test equipment, announcements, and various tones to trunks when required.

=== Processor ===
The processor acts as the CPU for the switch. The processor includes a central control, call stores, and program stores. In addition it had access to additional units through the auxiliary unit bus (AUB) and peripheral unit bus (PUB). A master control console (MCC) provides office technicians access to the switch through the processor peripheral interface (PPI). Early versions used the same 1A processor as the contemporaneous improved 1AESS switch. All existing switches have been subsequently upgraded to use the 1B processor.

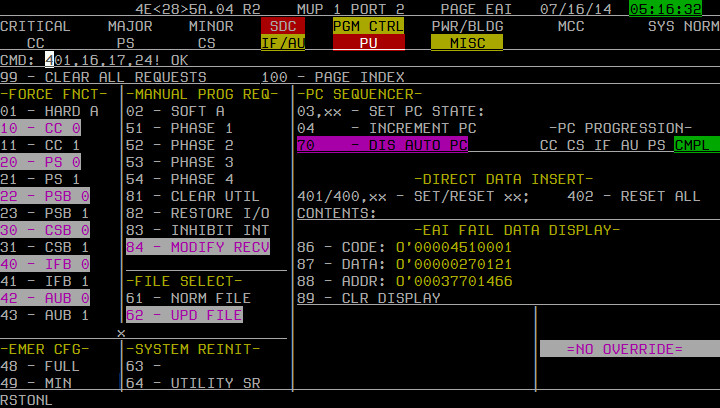
4ESS emergency action interface (EAI) displayed on the MCC

=== File store and CNI ring ===
The file store provides long term storage (disk storage) of the processor programs (program store) and office data (call store). It was first implemented using disk technology but was replaced by the 4E attached processor system (4EAPS). The 4EAPS is a 3B computer running 4EAPS application software on the DMERT operating system. The 4EAPS interfaces to the 4ESS processor via the attached processor interface (API) units. The "1A file store" became partitions on the 3B computer disks. At first the 4EAPS just provided "file store" but soon it also provided access to the common-network interface ring (CNI ring) to provide common-channel signaling (CCS). The 4EAPS originally used the 3B20D computer. These were all converted to the 3B21D around 1995.

=== Peripheral units ===
The peripheral units include units that interface to the central control over the peripheral unit bus. This includes the common channel interface signaling (CCIS) terminal, signal processors, time-slot interchanges (TSI) and time multiplexed switches (TMS). It also includes equipment not directly on the PUB including terminating equipment used to connect the switch to the transport network and the TSIs and TMSs, which actually perform the "time-space-time" switching function. Timing is provided by a high speed, high accuracy network clock.

== History ==
4ESS development began circa 1970, mainly in Naperville, Illinois under the direction of Henry Earle Vaughan. AT&T Long Distance was the primary customer for the switch. Driving development from the customer's perspective was AT&T VP Billy Oliver. Previous tandem switching systems, primarily the No. 4 Crossbar switch, used analog voice signaling. The decision to switch in a digital voice format was controversial at the time, both from a technical and economic viewpoint. Nevertheless, visionaries such as Vaughn and Oliver recognized that the network would eventually become digital, requiring digital switching technologies.

The last 4ESS was installed in suburban Atlanta, GA in 1999 as a toll tandem for AT&T. At the peak of the product's life time in 1999, AT&T employed 145 4ESS switches in its long-haul network, and several were owned by various Regional Bell Operating Companies (RBOCs).

In 2007, over 140 4ESS switches remained in service in the United States.

AT&T replaced or supplemented the 4ESS toll tandem switches with 5ESS switches, which featured an advanced design, and are used as edge switches in the network. Most RBOCs who used 4ESS tandems have replaced them with Class 5 systems of other manufacturers, e.g., Nortel. In 2014, AT&T operated and maintained approximately one hundred 4ESS switches in the public switched telephone network. As of December 2025, there is only one 4ESS left in the network in Anchorage, AK. The last 4ESS in the lower 48 states (Lansing, MI) was shut down on December 10, 2025.

== Next-generation 4ESS ==
The Nokia N4E-N1B (New 4ESS) is the ATCA-based next-generation toll switch for AT&T. The N4E-N1B includes the 4E APS and 4ESS software, but replaces the 1B processor and the peripheral units which run in emulated environments on an ATCA blade or commercial off-the-shelf servers. The N4E-N1B is based on the Alcatel-Lucent (now Nokia) gateway platform (7520 Media Gateway (MGW)), 1310 Operations and Management Console – Plus (OMC-P) and the 5400 Linux Control Platform (LCP) and includes other elements such as MRV console terminal servers.

Starting in the late 2010s and continuing in the early 2020s, AT&T has been replacing older 4ESS switches with N4E-N1B switches, and is also adding new N4E-N1B switches in new toll switching centers. It is assumed that these new N4E-N1B switches are taking over Class-4 functions that were previously handled by 5ESS switches acting as "edge tandems." By late 2025, approximately 45 N4E tandems operate in the network.

== See also ==
- 1ESS switch
- 5ESS switch
- Telephone exchange
- Bell System Practices
