= THEOS =

Computer operating system

THEOS / OASIS
- Developer: Phase One Systems / Timothy S. Williams / THEOS Software Corporation
- Initial release: 1977; 49 years ago
- Latest release: THEOS Corona Commercial Release 6 / December 2008; 17 years ago
- Available in: English
- Supported platforms: Zilog Z80, IBM Personal Computer/AT
- License: proprietary
- Official website: www.theos-software.com

THEOS, which translates from Greek as "God", is an operating system which started out as OASIS, a microcomputer operating system for small computers that use the Z80 processor. When the operating system was launched for the IBM Personal Computer/AT in 1982, the decision was taken to change the name from OASIS to THEOS, short for THE Operating System.

== History ==
=== OASIS ===
The OASIS operating system was originally developed and distributed in 1977 by Phase One Systems of Oakland, California (President Howard Sidorsky). OASIS was developed for the Z80 processor and was the first multi-user operating system for 8-bit microprocessor based computers (Z-80 from Zilog). "OASIS" was a backronym for "Online Application System Interactive Software".

OASIS consisted of a multi-user operating system, a powerful Business Basic/Interpreter, C compiler and a powerful text editor. Timothy Williams developed OASIS and was employed at Phase One. The market asked for 16-bit systems but there was no real 16-bit multi-user OS for 16-bit systems. Every month Phase One announced OASIS-16 but it did not come. One day Timothy Williams claimed that he owned OASIS and started a court case against Phase One and claimed several million U.S. dollars. Sidorsky had no choice and claimed Chapter 11. The court case took two years and finally the ruling was that Timothy Williams was allowed to develop the 16-bit version of OASIS but he was not allowed to use the OASIS name anymore.

David Shirley presented an alternative history at the Computer Information Centre, an OASIS distributor for the UK in the early 1980s. He said Timothy Williams developed the OASIS operating system and contracted with Phase One Systems to market and sell the product. Development was underway, but it was prematurely announced by POS. This led to pressure to release OASIS early, when it was still not properly debugged or optimised. OASIS 8-bit was quite well optimised by that point, with many parts hand-coded in Z80 assembler, but that meant then-new 16-bit systems performed nowhere near as well as their 8-bit counterparts. This situation led to Williams becoming dissatisfied with Phase One, and forming his own company to market and support the 16-bit OASIS. This new company was initially called Oasis Technologies, until Phase One took action to protect the name. Rather than fight a long and expensive court battle, Williams renamed the company and product to "THEOS". It was intended to mean "the OS" in the sense of "the one" ("Theos" is Greek for "God").

While Williams and Sidorsky fought in court, manufacturers had no 16-bit multi-user OS. This led to an agreement between Microsoft and Santa Cruz Operation to make a new operating system based on Version 7 Unix from Bell Labs. Microsoft purchased a license for Version 7 UNIX from AT&T in 1978, and announced on August 25, 1980, that it would make it available for the 16-bit microcomputer market. Because Microsoft was not able to license the "UNIX" name itself, it was called Xenix. Microsoft would distribute the product via Larry Michels and his son Doug Michels (Santa Cruz Operation).

Seiko also lost patience with THEOS and Williams, and decided to make their own OASIS 16-bit version and hired Dr. Jeffrey Bahr. When Xenix and THEOS became available Seiko did decide to leave this market. Jeffrey Bahr started CET which went on with the development of the 16-bit OASIS compatible software. CET software was completely compatible with OASIS/THEOS and allowed users entry to the Unix and Microsoft world.

CET acquired the Phase one company. Also, Phase One Systems licenses a porting tool called CET Basic. CET Basic is compatible with THEOS BASIC, MultiUser BASIC, OASIS BASIC, and UX-BASIC. This means you can keep most of your existing source code, and using W/32 BASIC, recompile your THEOS, OASIS, or UX-BASIC programs to work under additional operating systems such as Microsoft Windows, Linux or SCO UNIX.

=== THEOS ===
THEOS operating systems have been distributed by THEOS Software Corporation in Walnut Creek, California, since 1983. As of 2003, Phase One Systems publishes software development tools for THEOS(R) systems. As well as porting tools, Phase One Systems distributed the Freedom query package and Control database package for THEOS systems, used to bring SQL-like data extraction tools to third-party software packages.

THEOS was introduced in Europe by Fujitsu and other hardware manufacturers 30 years ago, and is distributed by a number of distributors in Great Britain, Spain, Portugal, Germany, Italy and more. The 'current' version is THEOS Corona Commercial Release 6, which was released in December 2008, and a number of updates have been released since that time. The current Windows Workstation Client (as of May 2009) is version 3.16 from July 2003.

== Features ==
Originally written in the late 1970s by Timothy S. Williams as a low-cost alternative to the more expensive mini- and mainframe- computers that were popular in the day, OASIS provided time-sharing multiuser facilities to allow several users to utilise the resources of one computer. Similar in concept to MP/M or UNIX, THEOS uses external device drivers rather than a kernel, allowing it to be more portable to other environments, though support has been primarily directed towards industry-standard hardware (i.e. PC's). THEOS is specifically aimed at small business users, with a wide range of vertical-market applications packages being developed and supported by individuals and companies.

The languages distributed with THEOS include THEOS Multi-User Basic and C. A powerful EXEC shell language can be used for task automation or to produce a turnkey system.

A number of security features exist, including dynamic passwords (where the password includes part of the date or time, or client IP address, or other dynamic elements), allow/deny security, a comprehensive inbound and outbound firewall, and an option to require a certain level of encryption in the workstation connection. In addition, the object file format is proprietary, and the operating system uses Intel "protected mode" to further increase defence against buffer overrun attacks.

=== Commands ===
The following list of commands are supported by the THEOS/OASIS Command String Interpreter (CSI).

- ACCOUNT
- ARCHIVE
- ASSIGN
- ATTACH
- BACKUP
- BASIC
- BULKERA
- CACHE
- CADVERF
- CHANGE
- CLASS
- COMPARE
- COPYFILE
- CREATE
- CSI
- DEBUG
- EDIT
- ERASE
- ERRMSG
- EXEC
- FILELIST
- FILT8080
- FORCE
- GETFILE
- HELP
- INITDISK
- INITTAPE
- KILL
- LIST
- LOGOFF
- LOGON
- MAILBOX
- MSG
- OWNERCHG
- PATCH
- PEEK
- RECEIVE
- RENAME
- REPAIR
- RESTORE
- SCRIPT
- SEND
- SET
- SHARE
- SHOW
- SPOOLER
- START
- STATE
- STOP
- SYSGEN
- TERMINAL
- TEXTEDIT
- UNLOAD

== Reception ==
BYTE in 1985 stated that "the functionality of THEOS is somewhere between MS-DOS and UNIX". The magazine criticized the documentation's quality, and concluded that the price was too high compared to other multiuser operating systems for the PC such as Pick and Coherent.

== See also ==
- Multiuser DOS Federation
