= Multiple accounts =

Multiple accounts may refer to:

- Alternate character (also known as an alt), an additional character in addition to a primary player character
  - Multi-boxing, playing multiple characters at the same time
- Multi-user, a system that allows more than one user of a computer
  - Time-sharing, a system that allows more than one user to access it at the same time
- Sockpuppet (Internet), an online identity used for purposes of deception
