= Henry Earle Vaughan =

- Born: February 3, 1912
- Died: March 9, 1978 (aged 66)
- Awards: IEEE Medal of Honor (1977)
- Scientific career
- Fields: Electrical engineering

Henry Earle Vaughan, better known as H. Earle Vaughan, (February 3, 1912 – March 9, 1978) was an American telephony engineer, responsible for system and software design for Bell Laboratories' Electronic Switching System No. 1 ESS, and for planning and development of No. 4 Electronic Switching System for long-distance telephony.

== Biography ==
In 1928 Vaughan began work in Bell Laboratories, then attended Cooper Union College in New York City, where in 1933 he received a Bachelor of Science degree. Throughout the next decade he worked on a variety of transmission and signaling projects, and in 1944 received the Naval Ordnance Award for his computer work. In 1945 he began research on two experimental switching systems: first the Electronically Controlled Automatic Switching System (ECASS), an experimental system using cold cathode gas tubes, reed switches and a special telephone set, and subsequently the Drum Information Assembler and Dispatcher (DIAD), a magnetic drum system that used vacuum tubes and semiconductor diodes. DIAD was the first switch with memory.

In 1952 Vaughan became a supervisor in Bell Labs' Switching Research Department, leading studies on transistor, ferroelectric, and magnetic core memories in logic systems. In 1955 he was named Head of the Switching Research Department and began work on the Experimental Solid State Exchange (ESSEX), a pioneering solid-state system using pulse-code modulation and a central time-division switch. In 1958 Vaughan became Director of the Systems Research Center, and in 1962 moved to the Switching Systems Development Area. In 1968, Vaughan assumed overall responsibility for planning and developing No. 4 ESS. He died on March 9, 1978, in Pinehurst, North Carolina.

== Awards ==
Vaughan is a Fellow of the Institute of Electrical and Electronics Engineers, holds 27 patents, and was awarded the IEEE Medal of Honor in 1977 "for his vision, technical contributions and leadership in the development of the first high-capacity pulse-code-modulation time-division telephone switching system."
