= TSX-32 =

- Developer: S&H Computer Systems, Inc.
- OS family: DOS
- Source model: Closed source
- Initial release: 1989; 36 years ago
- Latest release: 6.34 / 2002?
- License: Proprietary
- Official website: www.sandh.com/tsx32.htm

TSX-32 is a discontinued general purpose 32-bit multi-user multitasking operating system for the x86 architecture platform, with a command line user interface. It is compatible with some 16-bit DOS applications and supports the FAT16 and FAT32 file systems. It was developed by S&H Computer Systems, and has been available since 1989.

DEC-oriented columnist Kevin G. Barkes noted that TSX-32 is "not a port of the PDP-11 TSX-Plus" and that it runs well on 386, 486 and Pentium-based systems. He reported a limitation: since it supports the MS-DOS FAT file system, filenames are 8.3.

== TSX-Plus ==
An earlier non-DEC operating system, also from S&H, was named TSX-Plus. Released in 1980, TSX-Plus was the successor to TSX, released in 1976.

The strength of TSX-Plus is to simultaneously provide to multiple users the services of DEC's single-user RT-11. Depending on which PDP-11 model and the amount of memory, the system could support a minimum of 12 users (14-18 users on a 2 MB 11/73, depending on workload). A productivity feature called "virtual lines" "allows a single user to control several tasks from a single terminal."

== History ==
S&H wrote the original TSX because "Spending $25K on a computer that could only support one user bugged" (founder Harry Sanders); the outcome was the initial four-user TSX in 1976.

For TSX-32, they said in an interview, "We started with a clean sheet of paper" rather than starting with a "port."

=== VAX ===
The company's product line was ported/expanded for the VAX line.

== See also ==
- Multiuser DOS Federation
