= TSX-Plus =

Software

- Developer: S&H Computer Systems
- Available in: English
- Platforms: PDP-11/LSI-11
- License: Proprietary
- Official website: www.sandh.com

TSX-Plus is a multi-user operating system for the PDP-11/LSI-11 series of computers. It was developed by S&H Computer Systems, Inc. and is based on DEC's RT-11 single-user real-time operating system (TSX-Plus installs on top of RT-11).

== Overview ==
The system is highly configurable and tunable.

Due to the constraints of the memory management system in the PDP-11/LSI-11, the entire operating system core must occupy no more than 40 kibibytes of memory, out of a maximum possible 4 mebibytes of physical memory that can actually be installed in those machines (mandated by the 22-bit address space). The strength of TSX-Plus is to simultaneously provide to multiple users the services of DEC's single-user RT-11. Depending on which PDP-11 model and the amount of memory, the system could support a minimum of 12 users (14-18 users on a 2Mb 11/73, depending on workload). A productivity feature called "virtual lines" "allows a single user to control several tasks from a single terminal."

The software included a WP package named Lex-11 and a spreadsheet from Saturn Software. The machine slowed considerably if more than 8 students wanted to use the word-processing package at the same time. There was also a decision-table language called "D" from the NCC in Manchester which worked very well on TSX Plus.

== History ==
Released in 1980, TSX-Plus was the successor to TSX, released in 1976. The system was popular in the 1980s. The last version of TSX-Plus had TCP/IP support.

S&H wrote the original TSX because "Spending $25K on a computer that could only support one user bugged" (founder Harry Sanders); the outcome was the initial four-user TSX in 1976.

== Bootstrapping ==
TSX-Plus required bootstrapping RT-11 first before running TSX-Plus as a user program. Once TSX-Plus was running, it would take over complete control of the machine from RT-11. It provided true memory protection for users from other users, provided user accounts and maintained account separation on disk volumes and implemented a superset of the RT-11 EMT programmed requests. RT-11 programs generally ran, unmodified, under TSX-Plus and, in fact, most of the RT-11 utilities were used as-is under TSX-Plus. Device drivers generally required only slight modifications.

== See also ==
- TSX-32
