= 3B series computers =

AT&T/Bell family of computers

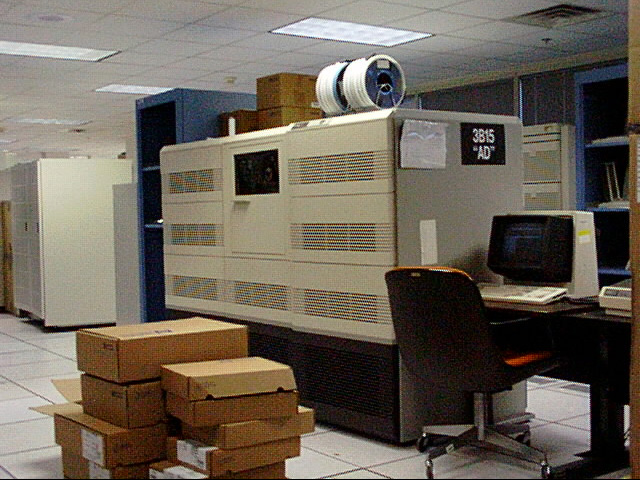
A 3B15 computer, circa 1997

The 3B series computers are a line of minicomputers made between the late 1970s and 1993 by AT&T Computer Systems' Western Electric subsidiary, for use with the company's UNIX operating system. The line primarily consists of the models 3B20, 3B5, 3B15, 3B2, and 3B4000. The series is notable for controlling a series of electronic switching systems for telecommunications, for general computing purposes, and for serving as the historical software porting base for commercial UNIX.

== History ==
The first 3B20D was installed in Fresno, California at Pacific Bell in 1981. Within two years, several hundred were in place throughout the Bell System. Some of the units came with "small, slow hard disks".

The general purpose family of 3B computer systems includes the 3B2, 3B5, 3B15, 3B20S, and 3B4000. They run the AT&T UNIX operating system and were named after the successful 3B20D High Availability processor.

In 1984, after regulatory constraints were lifted, AT&T introduced the 3B20D, 3B20S, 3B5, and 3B2 to the general computer market, a move that some commentators saw as an attempt to compete with IBM. In Europe, the 3B computers were distributed by Italian firm Olivetti, in which AT&T had a minority shareholding. After AT&T bought NCR Corporation, effective January 1992, the computers were marketed through NCR sales channels.

Having produced 70,000 units, the AT&T Oklahoma City plant stopped manufacturing 3B machines at the end of 1993, with the 3B20D to be the last units manufactured.

== 3B high-availability processors ==
The original series of 3B computers includes the models 3B20C, 3B20D superminicomputer, 3B21D, and 3B21E.

These systems are 32-bit microprogrammed duplex (redundant) high availability processor units running a real-time operating system. They were first produced in the late 1970s at the Western Electric factory in Lisle, Illinois, for telecommunications applications including the 4ESS and 5ESS systems.

They use the Duplex Multi Environment Real Time (DMERT) operating system which was renamed UNIX-RTR (Real Time Reliable) in 1982. The Data Manipulation Unit (DMU) provides arithmetic and logic operations on 32-bit words using eight AMD 2901 4-bit-slice ALUs. The first 3B20D is called the Model 1. Each processor's control unit consists of two frames of circuit packs. The whole duplex system requires seven-foot frames of circuit packs plus at least one tape drive frame (most telephone companies at that time wrote billing data on magnetic tapes), and many washing machine-sized disk drives. For training and lab purposes, a 3B20D can be divided into two "half-duplex" systems. A 3B20S consists of most of the same hardware as a half-duplex but uses a completely different operating system.

The 3B20C was briefly available as a high-availability, fault-tolerant multiprocessing general-purpose computer in the commercial market in 1984. The 3B20E was created to provide a cost-reduced 3B20D for small offices that did not expect such high availability. It consists of a virtual "emulated" 3B20D environment running on a stand-alone general purpose computer; the system was ported to many computers, but primarily runs on the Sun Microsystems Solaris environment.

There were improvements to the 3B20D UNIX-RTR system in both software and hardware in the 1980s, 1990s, 2000s, and 2010s. Innovations included disk independent operation (DIOP: the ability to continue essential software processing such as telecommunications after duplex failure of redundant essential disks); off-line boot (the ability to split in half and boot the out-of-service half, typically on a new software release) and switch forward (switch processing to the previously out-of-service half); upgrading the disks to solid-state drive (SSD); and upgrading the tape unit to CompactFlash.

The processor was re-engineered and renamed in 1992 as the 3B21D. It is still in use as of 2023 as a component of Nokia products such as the 2STP signal transfer point and the 4ESS and 5ESS switches, which Nokia inherited from AT&T spin-off Lucent Technologies.

== Minicomputers ==
=== 3B20S ===
The 3B20S (simplex) was developed at Bell Labs and produced by Western Electric in 1982 for general purpose internal Bell System use. The 3B20S has hardware similar to the 3B20D, but one unit instead of two. The machine is approximately the size of a large refrigerator, requiring a minimum of 170 square feet floor space. It was in use at the 1984 Summer Olympics, where around twelve 3B20S served the email requirements of the Electronic Messaging System, which was built to replace the man-based messaging system of earlier Olympiads. The system connected around 1800 user terminals and 200 printers. The 3B20A is an enhanced version of the 3B20S, adding in a second processing unit working in parallel as a multiprocessor unit.

=== 3B5 ===
The 3B5 is built with the older Western Electric WE 32000 32-bit microprocessor. The initial versions have discrete memory management unit hardware using gate arrays, and support segment-based memory translation. I/O is programmed using memory-mapped techniques. The machine is approximately the size of a dishwasher, though adding the reel-to-reel tape drive increases its size. These computers use SMD hard drives.

=== 3B15 ===
The 3B15, introduced in 1985, uses the WE 32100 and is the faster follow-on to the 3B5 with similar large form factor.

=== 3B4000 ===
The 3B4000 is a high availability server introduced in 1987 and based on a 'snugly-coupled' architecture using the WE series 32x00 32-bit processor. Known internally as 'Apache', the 3B4000 is a follow-on to the 3B15 and initial revisions use a 3B15 as a master processor. Developed in the mid-1980's at the Lisle Indian Hill West facility by the High Performance Computer Development Lab, the system consists of multiple high performance (at the time) processor boards – adjunct processing elements (APEs) and adjunct communication elements (ACEs). These adjunct processors run a customized UNIX kernel with drivers for SCSI (APEs) and serial boards (ACEs). The processing boards are interconnected by a redundant low-latency parallel bus (ABUS) running at 20 MB/s. The UNIX kernels running on the adjunct processors are modified to allow the fork/exec of processes across processing units. The system calls and peripheral drivers are also extended to allow processes to access remote resources across the ABUS. Since the ABUS is hot-swappable, processors can be added or replaced without shutting down the system. If one of the adjunct processors fails during operation, the system can detect and restart programs that were running on the failed element.

The 3B4000 is capable of significant expansion; one test system (including storage) occupies 17 mid-height cabinets. Generally, the performance of the system increases linearly with additional processing elements, however the lack of a true shared memory capability requires rewriting applications that rely heavily on this feature to avoid a severe performance penalty.

== Microcomputers ==
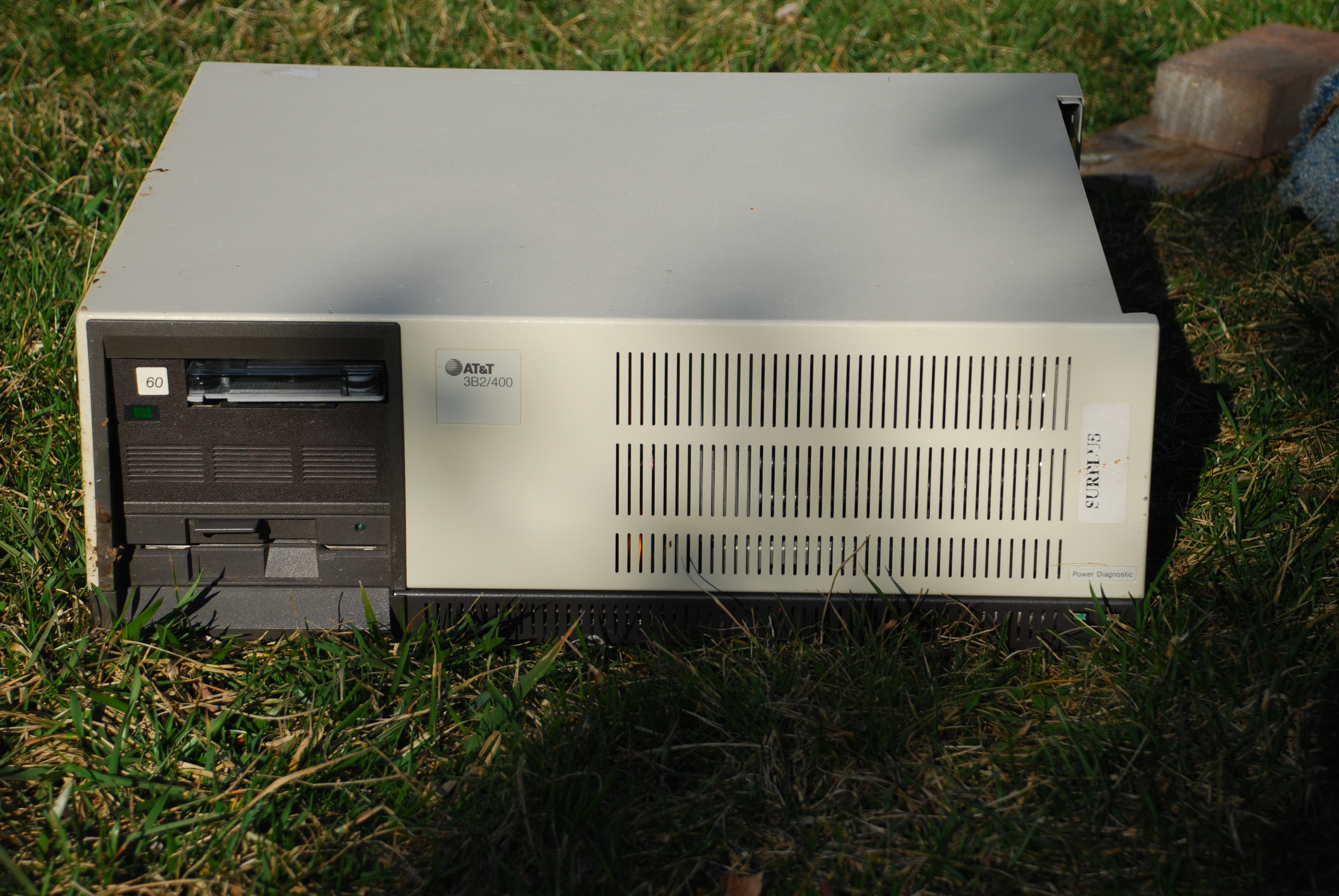
A 3B2 model 400

=== 3B2 ===
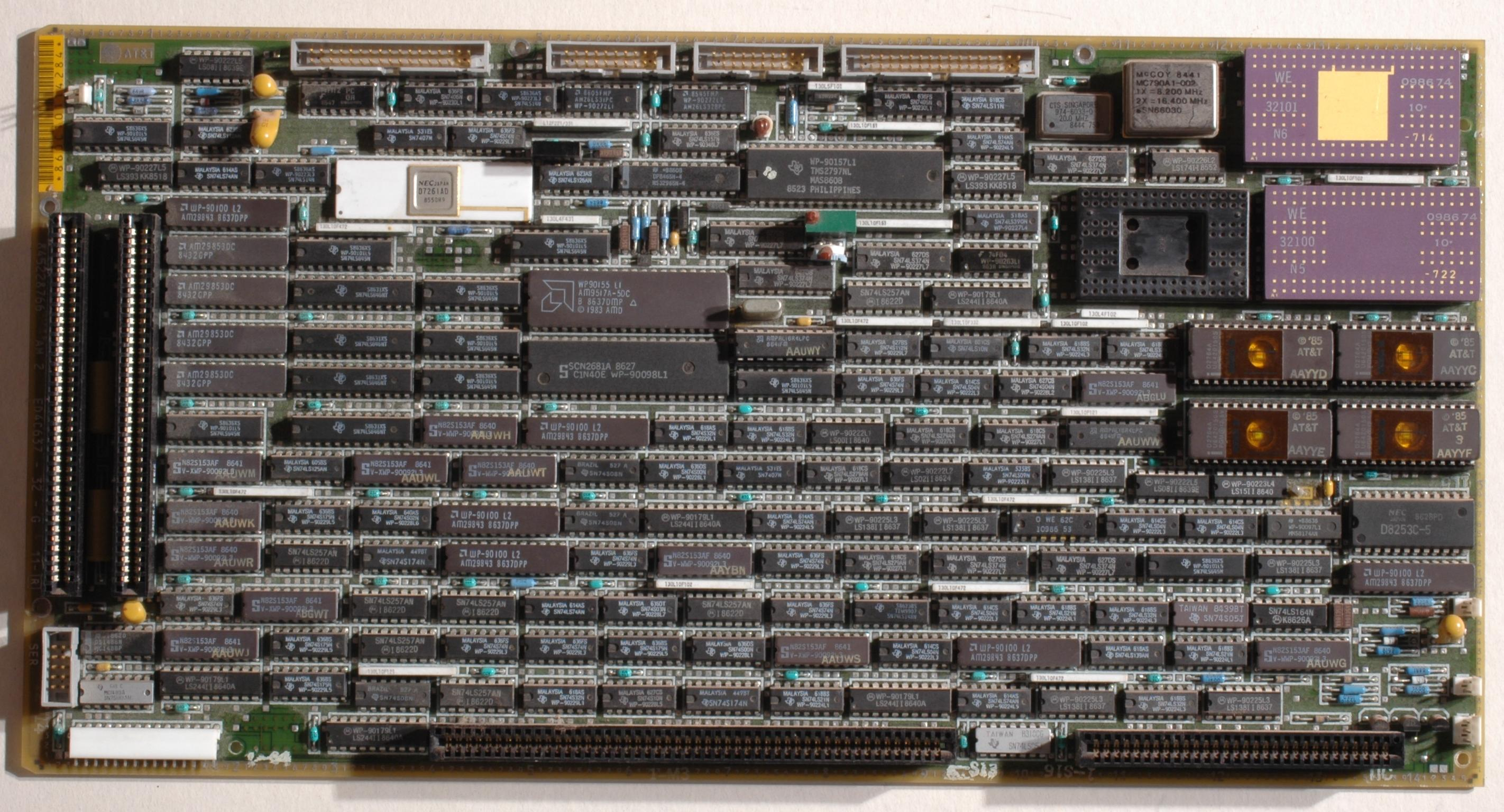
3B2/300 motherboard

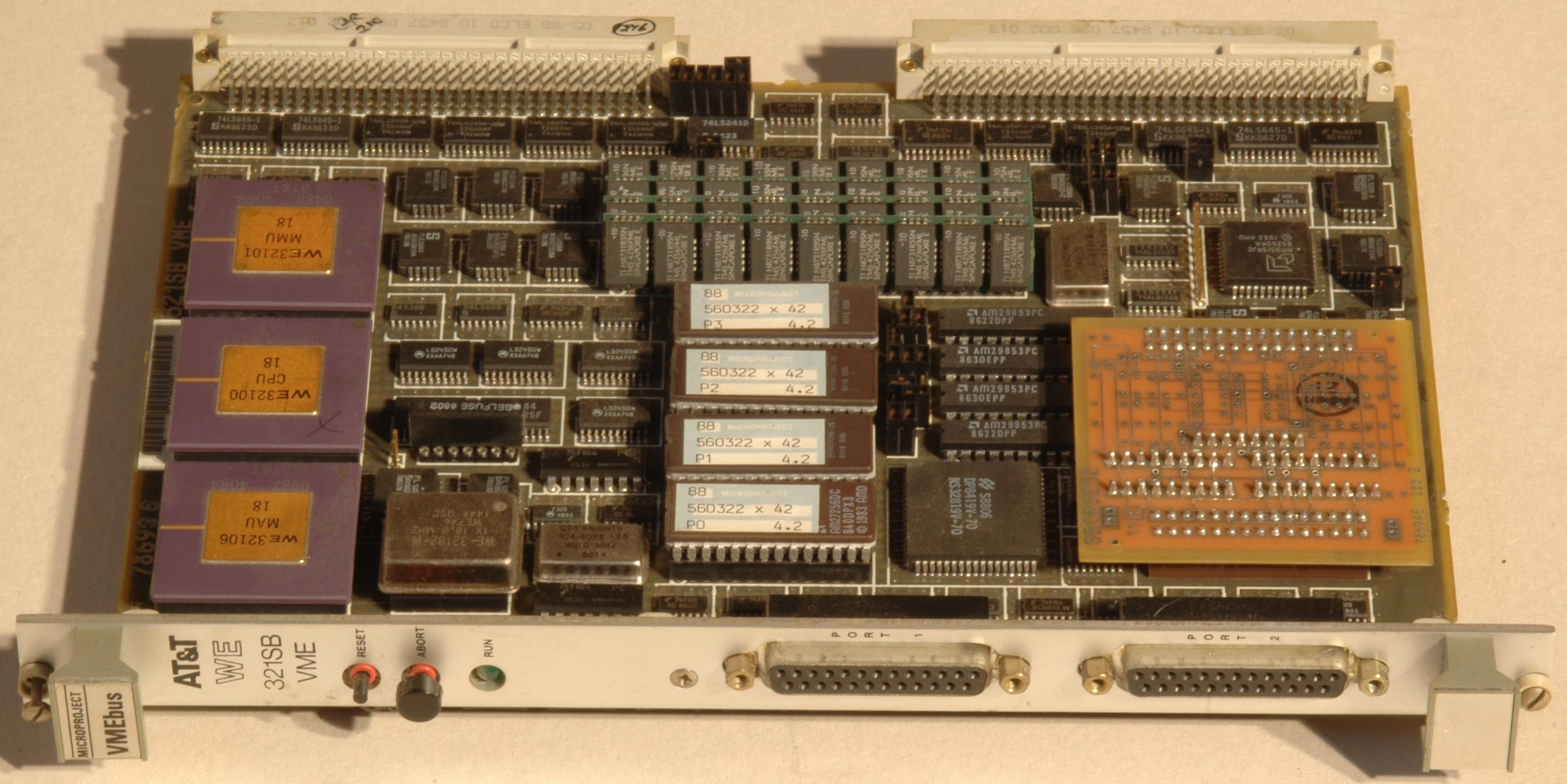
WE 321SB VMEbus Single Board Computer

The 3B2 was introduced in 1984 using the WE 32000 32-bit microprocessor at 8 MHz with memory management chips that supports demand paging. Uses include the Switching Control Center System. The 3B2 Model 300, which can support up to 18 users, is approximately 4 inches (100 mm) high and the 3B2 Model 400 is approximately 8 inches (200 mm) high.

The 300 was soon supplanted by the 3B2/310 running at 10 MHz, which features the WE 32100 CPU as do later models. The Model 400, introduced in 1985, allows more peripheral slots and more memory, and has a built-in 23 MB QIC tape drive managed by a floppy disk controller (nicknamed the "floppy tape"). These three models use standard MFM 5 1/4" hard disk drives.

There are also Model 100 and Model 200 3B2 systems.

The 3B2/600, running at 18 MHz, offers an improvement in performance and capacity: it features a SCSI controller for the 60 MB QIC tape and two internal full-height disk drives. The 600 is approximately twice as tall as a 400, and is oriented with the tape and floppy disk drives opposite the backplane (instead of at a right angle to it as on the 3xx, 4xx and later 500 models). Early models use an internal Emulex card to interface the SCSI controller with ESDI disks, with later models using SCSI drives directly.

The 3B2/500 was the next model to appear, essentially a 3B2/600 with enough components removed to fit into a 400 case; one internal disk drive and several backplane slots are sacrificed in this conversion. Unlike the 600, which because of its two large fans is loud, the 500 is tolerable in an office environment, like the 400.

The 3B2/700 is an uprated version of the 600 featuring a slightly faster processor (WE 32200 at 22 MHz), and the 3B2/1000 is an additional step in this direction (WE 32200 at 24 MHz).

=== 3B1 desktop workstation ===
Officially named the AT&T UNIX PC, AT&T introduced a desktop computer in 1985 that is often dubbed the 3B1. However, this workstation is unrelated in hardware to the 3B line, and is based on the Motorola 68010 microprocessor. It runs a derivative of Unix System V Release 2 by Convergent Technologies. The system, which is also known as the PC-7300, is tailored for use as a productivity tool in office environments and as an electronic communication center.

== See also ==
- Altos Computer Systems
