= Common-network interface ring =

Telephony signaling device

The common-network interface ring (CNI ring) provides common-channel signaling (CCS) functionality on several Alcatel-Lucent SS7 products. It was introduced by Western Electric in the early 1980s but is still used today in all 1AESS and 4ESS, offices, and most of the wireline 5ESS offices.

It was designed and manufactured at the combined Bell Labs–WECo location in Columbus, Ohio.
