= Alloy Computer Products =

- Industry: Information technology
- Founded: 1979; 47 years ago in Framingham, Massachusetts
- Headquarters: Near Melbourne, Australia
- Products: Networking and VoIP products
- Website: www.alloy.com.au

Alloy Computer Products is an Australian manufacturer of information technology products based near Melbourne. As of 2007, the company currently markets networking and VoIP products. The company was originally based in Framingham, Massachusetts, and at one point was a major producer of QIC format tape drives and other computer peripherals. In the mid 1990s the company was no longer profitable. It filed for bankruptcy in the U.S. and the Australian subsidiary was bought out by the management team from the Australian division.

== History ==
Alloy Computer Products, Inc., was founded in 1979. Alloy was initially founded to supply hard drive and tape backup systems for S-100 bus computers running CP/M. When IBM's PC was released, Alloy provided hard drive storage and tape backup solutions for the new system. Alloy Computer Products later developed and marketed multi-user computer systems for the emerging microcomputer marketplace. Alloy later developed printing accelerator hardware.

In 1984 Alloy developed the PC-Slave card which consisted of an x86 (8086 or V20) processor, either 256 KB or 1 MB of memory and two serial ports. Later, an Intel 80286-based version was released, called the PC-Slave/286. These cards used RTNX (later renamed NTNX) to allow the host computer to provide disk storage and printing support. Dumb PC-terminals were attached to the PC-Slave to allow the running of DOS programs. At the time, using this solution was more cost-effective than using separate networked computers, but as computers and networking hardware became cheaper and cheaper, Alloy's advantage was overshadowed by the disadvantages of not being able to support graphics, etc. Alloy also developed a PC-Bus expansion bus system to allow the install of up to 32 PC-Slave cards attached to a single host PC. This allowed 32 user networks to be created, but each network was completely standalone.

Based on the knowledge learned by developing the PC-Slave card, in 1985 Alloy developed the DOS-73 co-processor board for the AT&T UNIX PC, allowing AT&T's Unix-based UNIX PC (a.k.a. the PC 7300 and the 3B1) to run MS-DOS based programs.

Alloy grew to $50 million in annual sales by 1986 and executed a successful IPO in June of that year. Alloy had an installed base of 150,000 users by the early 1990s, largely small businesses, comprising a relatively significant portion of the multi-user DOS marketplace. One DOS based computer was equipped with a multi-user/multi-tasking operating system called "386/MultiWare" which along with specialized hardware could provide serial connectivity to up to 20 dumb terminal clients. Each dumb terminal was connected to a session running up to 8 concurrent DOS virtual machines, all running on the host computer. If a problem arose with a single DOS virtual machine it could be rebooted without an effect on other terminals attached. Later "MultiNode" was introduced to meet client needs using the Novell network operating system allowing both Client/Server network connectivity as well as serial terminal users.

== See also ==
- Multiuser DOS Federation
