= AT&T UNIX PC =

1980s Unix desktop computer

UNIX PC / PC 7300 / 3B1
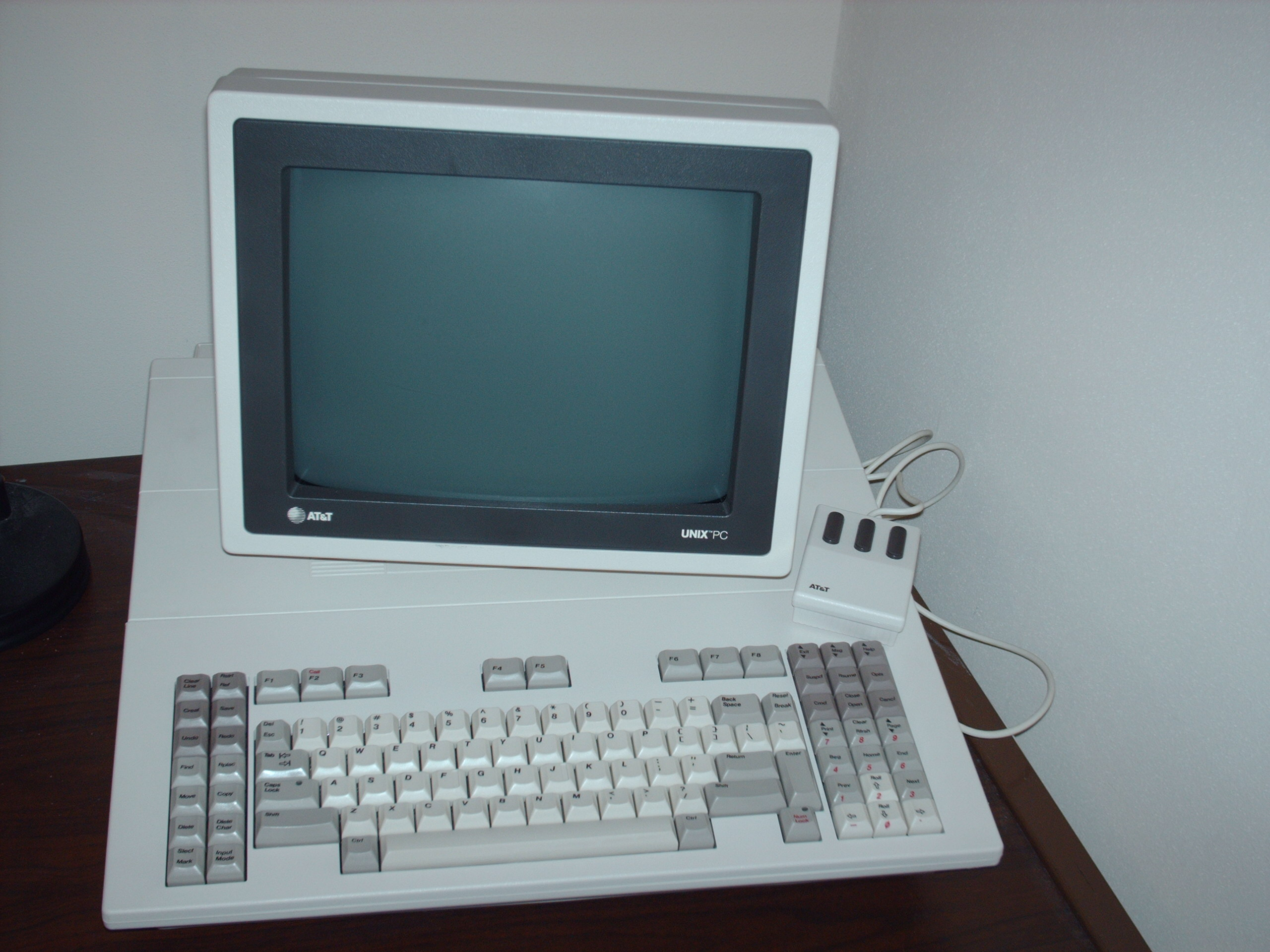
- AT&T UNIX PC
- Manufacturer: Convergent Technologies
- Type: Professional Computer
- Released: March 26, 1985
- Introductory price: US$5,095 (equivalent to $15,300 in 2025) - US$7,290 (equivalent to $21,800 in 2025)
- Media: 5¼-inch floppy disks, optional QIC tapes
- Operating system: AT&T UNIX v3.51 (Based on SVR2)
- CPU: Motorola 68010 with custom MMU clocked at 10 MHz
- Memory: 512 KB to 4 MB RAM
- Storage: 10 MB, Optional 20 MB, 40 MB, and 67 MB hard drives
- Display: 12 inches (30 cm), 720 x 348
- Input: Keyboard, 3-button Mouse
- Connectivity: RS-232 port, Parallel port, 3 phone jacks
- Weight: 40 lb (18 kg)

The AT&T UNIX PC is a Unix desktop computer originally developed by Convergent Technologies (later acquired by Unisys), and marketed by AT&T Information Systems in the mid- to late-1980s. The system was codenamed "Safari 4" and is also known as the PC 7300. An updated version with larger hard drive was dubbed the "3B1". Despite the latter name, the system had little in common with AT&T's line of 3B series computers. The system was tailored for use as a productivity tool in office environments and as an electronic communication center.

== Hardware configuration ==
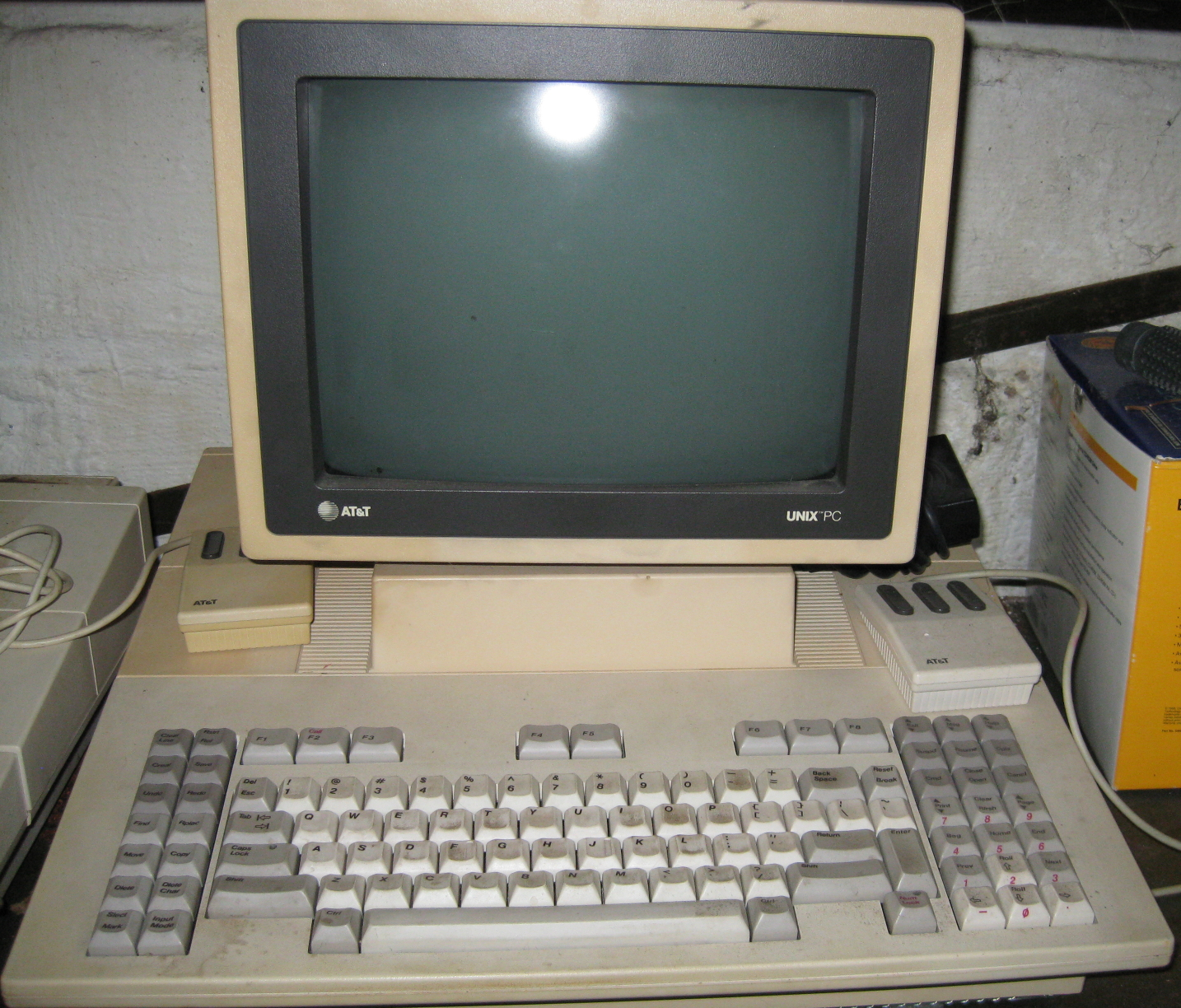
Exterior of the AT&T 3B1

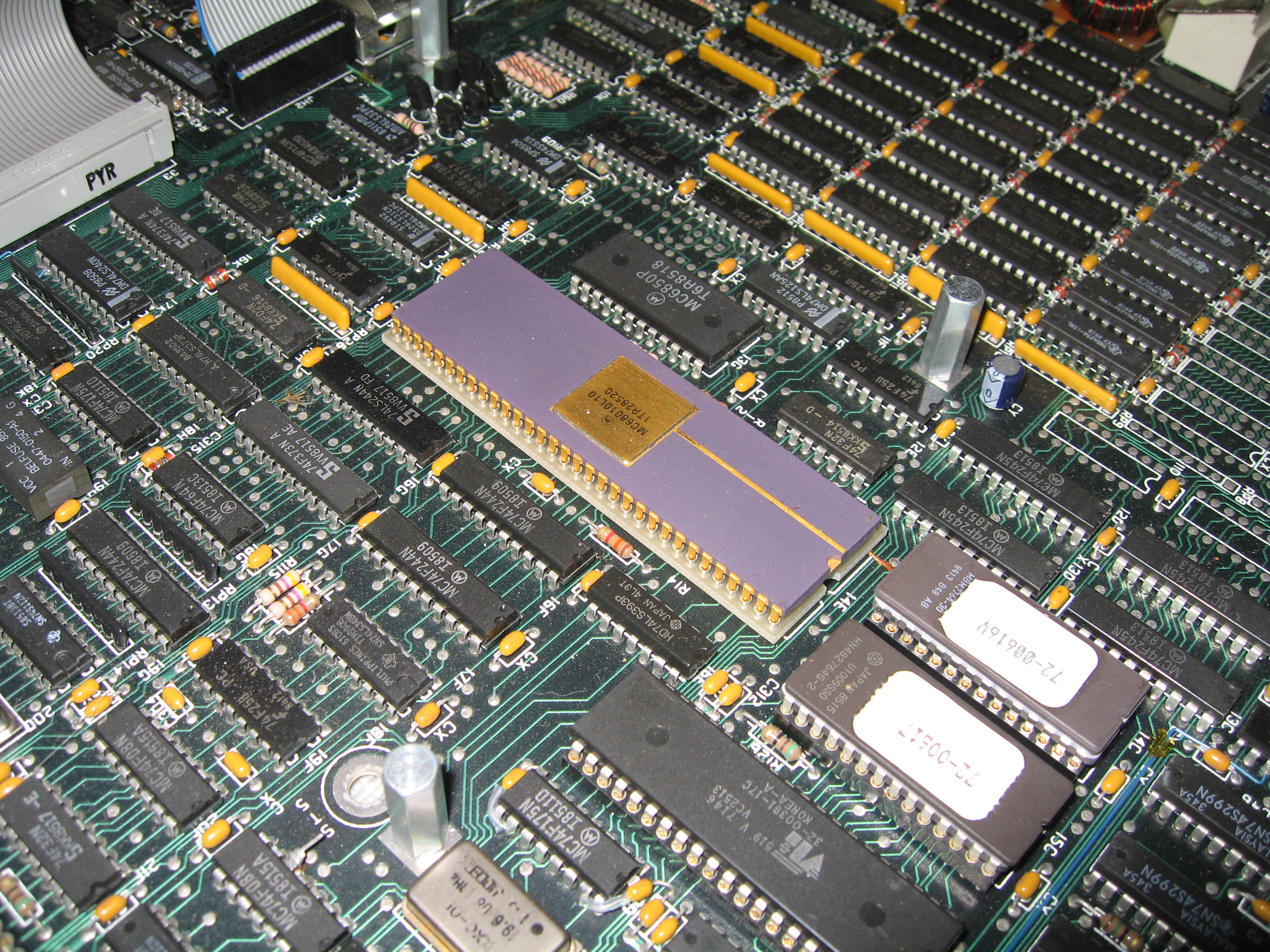
Motorola 68010 in an AT&T 7300 UNIX PC

- 10 MHz Motorola 68010 (16-bit external bus, 32-bit internal) with custom, discrete MMU
- Internal MFM hard drive, originally 10 MB, later models with up to 67 MB
- Internal 5-1/4" floppy drive
- At least 512 KB RAM on main board (1 MB or 2 MB were also options), expandable up to an additional 2 MB via expansion cards (4 MB max total)
- 32 KB VRAM
- 16 KB ROM (up to 32 KB ROM supported using 2x 27128 EPROMs)
- 2 KB SRAM (for MMU page table)
- Monochrome green phosphor 12-inch (300 mm) monitor
- Internal 300/1200 bit/s modem
- RS-232 serial port
- Centronics parallel port
- 3 S4BUS expansion slots
- 3 phone jacks

=== PC 7300 ===
The initial PC 7300 model offered a modest 512 KB of memory and a small, low-performance 10 MB hard drive. This model, although progressive in offering a Unix system for desktop office operation, was underpowered and produced considerable fan and drive bearing noise even when idling. The modern-looking "wedge" design by Mike Nuttall was innovative, and the machine gained notoriety appearing in numerous movies and TV shows as the token "computer".

=== AT&T 3B/1 ===
An enhanced model, "3B/1", was introduced in October 1985 starting at US$8,495 (equivalent to $25,400 in 2025). The cover was redesigned to accommodate a full-height 67 MB hard drive. This cover change added a 'hump' to the case, expanded onboard memory to 1 or 2 MB, as well as added a better power supply.

=== S/50 ===
Convergent Technologies offered an S/50 which was a re-badged PC 7300.

=== Olivetti AT&T 3B1 ===
Olivetti released the "Olivetti AT&T 3B1 Computer" in Europe.

== Operating system ==
Video of an AT&T PC 7300 booting

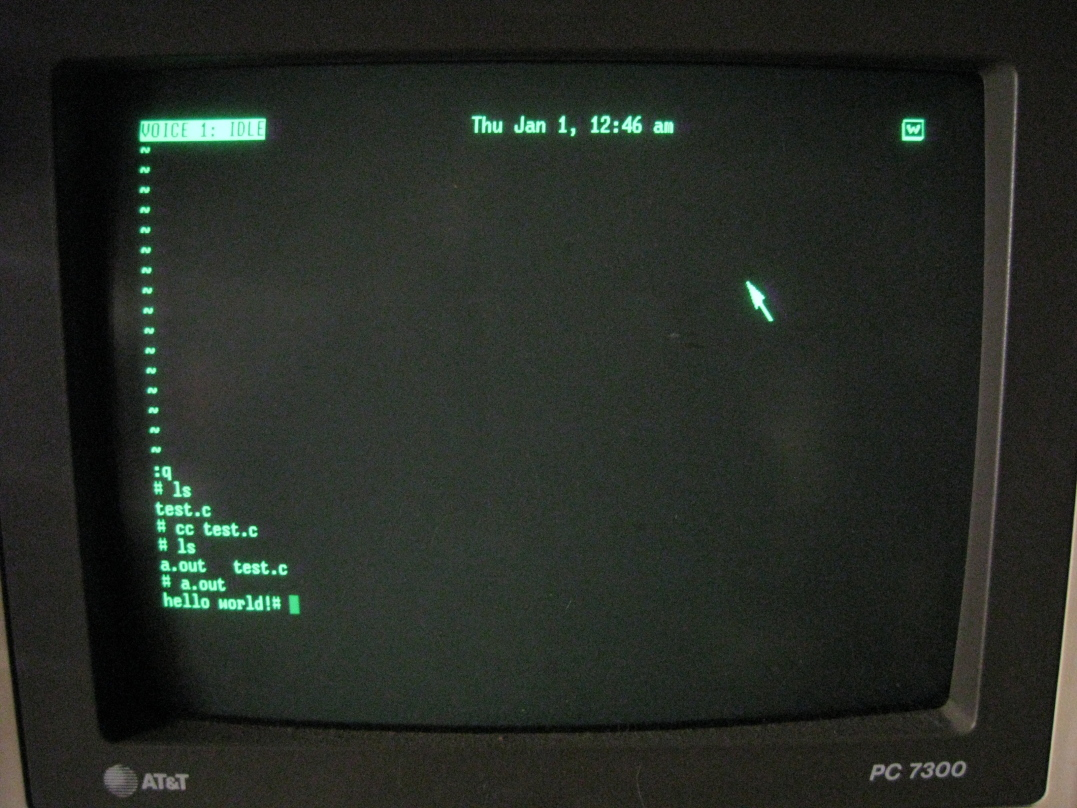
AT&T PC 7300 compiling and running a C program

The operating system is based on Unix System V Release 2, with extensions from 4.1 and 4.2 BSD, System V Release 3 and Convergent Technologies. The last release was 3.51.

Windowing software (xt/layers) from SVR3 was provided to allow connection to a DMD 5620 graphics terminal.

== Programming languages ==
- AT&T BASIC
- dBase III
- GNU C++
- LISP
- LPI C
- LPI COBOL
- LPI DEBUG (debugger)
- LPI Fortran
- LPI Pascal
- LPI PL/I
- Microsoft BASIC
- RM/COBOL
- RM/Fortran
- SMC BASIC
- SVS Fortran
- SVS Pascal

== Application software ==
- Business Graphics (produces chart graphics from 20/20 spreadsheet data)
- dBASE III (DBM)
- Informix (DBM)
- Oracle (DBM)
- Paint Power (drawing package)
- Samna/AT&T Write Power 2 (word processor/spreadsheet)
- Samna Plus (word processor/spreadsheet)
- SMART System (Office Suite)
- Sound Presentations (presentation graphics)

=== Spreadsheet software ===
- 20/20 (Supercomp 20)
- Microsoft Multiplan

=== Word processors ===
- AT&T Word Processor
- Crystal Writer
- Microsoft Word
- Samna Word
- SMART Word Processor
- WordMarc
- WordStar 2000

=== Games ===
- Chess
- Klondike
- Life
- Mahjongg
- Larn
- Moria
- NetHack
- Pac-Man clone
- Robots
- Rocks (Asteroids clone)
- Super-Rogue 9.0
- Tetris clone

=== Utility ===
- EMACS
- HoneyDanBer UUCP package
- KA9Q (implements SLIP, built-in FTP, telnet, SMTP, finger which are otherwise not available without installing the Ethernet software)
- Kermit
- MGR window system
- Pcomm (ProComm clone)
- SPICE/NUTMEG (circuit simulation tool)
- TeX
- Various shells: Bourne, C, and Korn

== Expansion cards ==
The UNIX PC has three proprietary S4BUS slots for expansion cards:

- DOS-73 8086 co-processor card running at 8 MHz, Hercules graphics-compatible, with 512 KB RAM, an RS-232 COM2 port and optional 8087 math co-processor. Mouse, floppy, modem (on COM1), and printer are shared in a DOS session. MS-DOS 3.1 was included. This board was designed and built for AT&T by Alloy Computer Products of Framingham, MA.
- RAM could be added using 512 KB RAM or 2 MB RAM cards, up to a maximum of 4 MB (2 MB on the motherboard and 2 MB on expansion cards).
- EIA/RAM combo cards contained extra RAM (512 KB, 1 MB, or 1.5 MB) and two RS-232 serial ports.
- Dual EIA port card (same card as the EIA/RAM but without the RAM sockets)
- StarLAN 1 Mbit/s (1BASE5) network over twisted-pair wire local area network typically used in star format
- Ethernet 10 Mbit/s LAN card (AMD Lance-based) using AUI connector and Wollongong TCP/IP stack/drivers
- AUDIX Voice Power (“Speech Processor”) card allowed for the capture and digital recording of voice conversations. This was an option of the "Integrated Solution" package for the AT&T System 25 PBX where the UNIX PC served as the "Master Controller".
- PC/PBX Connection Package 4 for AT&T PBX System 75 or System 85
- Floppy Tape card provided interface for 23 MB MFM Tape Cartridge Drive (e.g. Cipher FloppyTape 525)
- QIC-02 card for tape backup
- Expansion chassis card was hard-wired to the externally-powered Expansion Unit with five additional S4BUS slots (manufactured by Alloy Computer Products)
- Piiceon Model SR-2048 (2 MB) RAM expansion card

== Public domain software ==
The STORE! was a public domain software repository provided by AT&T and accessible via dialup UUCP.

== Emulation ==
The FreeBee emulator is available at FreeBee on GitHub.

== Cancelled successor ==
Three prototypes of a follow-on "P6" model were alleged to have been built with the specifications claimed to be:

- Motorola 68020
- Optional Motorola 68881 FPU
- SIMM sockets for up to 16 MB RAM
- Color monitor
- 2400 baud modem
- 60 MB QIC tape

== See also ==
- AT&T 6300 Plus
- Convergent Technologies
- DEC Professional
- IBM RT PC
- IBM System 9000
