= VM/386 =

- Developer: Softguard Systems, Intelligent Graphics Corporation (IGC)
- Working state: Historic
- Initial release: 1987; 38 years ago
- Available in: English
- Platforms: Intel 80386
- License: Proprietary

VM/386 is a multitasking Multi-user environment or 'control program' that took early advantage of the capabilities of Intel's 386 processor. By utilizing Virtual 8086 mode, users were able to run their existing text-based and graphical DOS software in safely separate environments. The system offered a high degree of control, with the ability to set memory limits, CPU usage and scheduling parameters, device assignments, and interrupt priorities through a virtual machine manager menu. Unique CONFIG.SYS and AUTOEXEC.BAT files could be configured for each application, and even different DOS versions. In 1991 the vendor announced intentions to support DPMI 1.0 in VM/386.

== Overview ==
VM/386 had initially been developed by Softguard Systems, a producer of copy-protection software, with plans to include features like non-DOS system support, but financial constraints forced its sale to Intelligent Graphics Corporation (IGC), which launched the product in 1987. It won a PC Magazine award for technical excellence in 1988. The company also introduced a multi-user version, which allowed a number of serial terminals and even graphical systems to be connected to a single 386 computer. Current versions of the software have built on the multi-user support, and can handle tens of users in a networked environment with Windows 3.11 support, access controls, virtual memory and device sharing, among other features.

A version of the software designed to cooperate with Unix was bundled with Everex Systems workstations. The system now sees use mainly in vertical applications like point-of-sale systems, where its ability to run reliably on cheap, reliable hardware outweigh any gains from newer operating systems that are more complex and less reliable.

Early competition included DESQview 386, Sunny Hill Software's Omniview, StarPath Systems' Vmos/3, and Windows/386 2.01. As the target market shifted away from single-user systems to multiple-user setups with many serial terminals it began to compete more directly with the likes of Multiuser DOS and PC-MOS/386.

== See also ==
- Virtual DOS machine
- Multiuser DOS Federation
