= Multiuser DOS Federation =

The Multiuser DOS Federation (MDOS) was an industry alliance to promote the growth and acceptance of multi-user DOS-based solutions on 286, 386 and 486 computers. It was formed in July 1990. Initially among them were Digital Research, Theos Software, SunRiver, DigiBoard, Alloy, Viewport International and others. The idea was to reduce costs by allowing workgroups to run DOS applications from a shared PC while working on terminals or workstations.

On 18 February 1991, several members of the Multiuser DOS Federation issued a press release regarding their intentions to support DPMI (mostly DPMI 1.0) in their products including Alloy Computer Products Inc. (PC-PLUS), Bluebird Systems, Inc. (SuperDOS), Concurrent Controls, Inc. (CCI Concurrent DOS 386, CCI Multiuser DOS), Digital Research, Inc. (DR Multiuser DOS), S&H Computer Systems, Inc. (TSX-32), StarPath Systems, Inc. (Vmos/3), The Software Link (PC-MOS/386), THEOS Software Corporation (THEOS), Intelligent Graphics Corporation (VM/386). Several of them had previously worked on the alternative XVCPI specification.

== See also ==
- AT Multiuser System
- Virtual DOS machine
