= Multi-user BASIC =

Multi-user BASIC was a dialect of the BASIC language for the DEC PDP-11 running the RT-11 operating system. One or more users were supported in separate address spaces sharing the same language interpreter. The syntax of the language was similar to but not identical to BASIC-11. A key language element was the support for virtual files. These were similar to the virtual arrays in BASIC-PLUS in but more limited. An array of integers, floating-point, or character strings of length 1, 2, 4, 8, 16, 32, or 64 could be placed in file and accessed with a subscript. The file could actually be opened (or re-opened) with a different definition allowing integers, characters, and floating point numbers to be stored in the same file.

Like BASIC-11, Multi-User BASIC provided some support for lab equipment, support for character terminals (LA30, VT100). Because it was a multi-user system, it did not support real-time data collection.
