= Computer trainer =

Small computer to teach processor logic

A computer trainer, sometimes known as a microprocessor trainer, is a type of small computer intended to introduce electronics and logic to new users. They were mostly used in the 1960s and 70s, although examples before and after that period can be found. They are very simple systems, similar to modern single board computers, but lack significant general-purpose capabilities. Trainers were often similar to electronics kits, especially during the early microprocessor era, compared to modern small computer systems like the Raspberry Pi which have significant use outside the training role.

== History ==
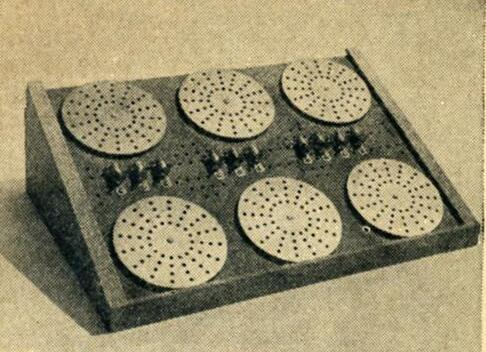
The Geniac implemented logic entirely built of wiring.

An early example of a computer trainer is the 1955 Geniac, which the company referred to as an "electronic brain construction kit". Geniac consisted of a series of disks into which plugs were inserted to produce different circuit connections when the disks were rotated. Thus one could make a system where turning disk 1 to position 1 might light lamp 2. With enough work, the system could be used to produce a number of combinatorial logic operations that could be accessed with the right set of disk and switch positions. The system could be used to play Nim for instance. Examples using analog circuits were also common through the 1950s and 60s, essentially operating as electronic slide rules.

The expanding computer market in the early 1960s led to a second wave of trainers, this time dedicated to the task of introducing digital logic. An example is the Digital Equipment Corporation's (DEC) H-500 Computer Lab. This contained a number of logic elements for typical boolean logic operations like AND and OR, along with switches and wiring plugs. The user could connect the elements together to produce practical circuits like adders.

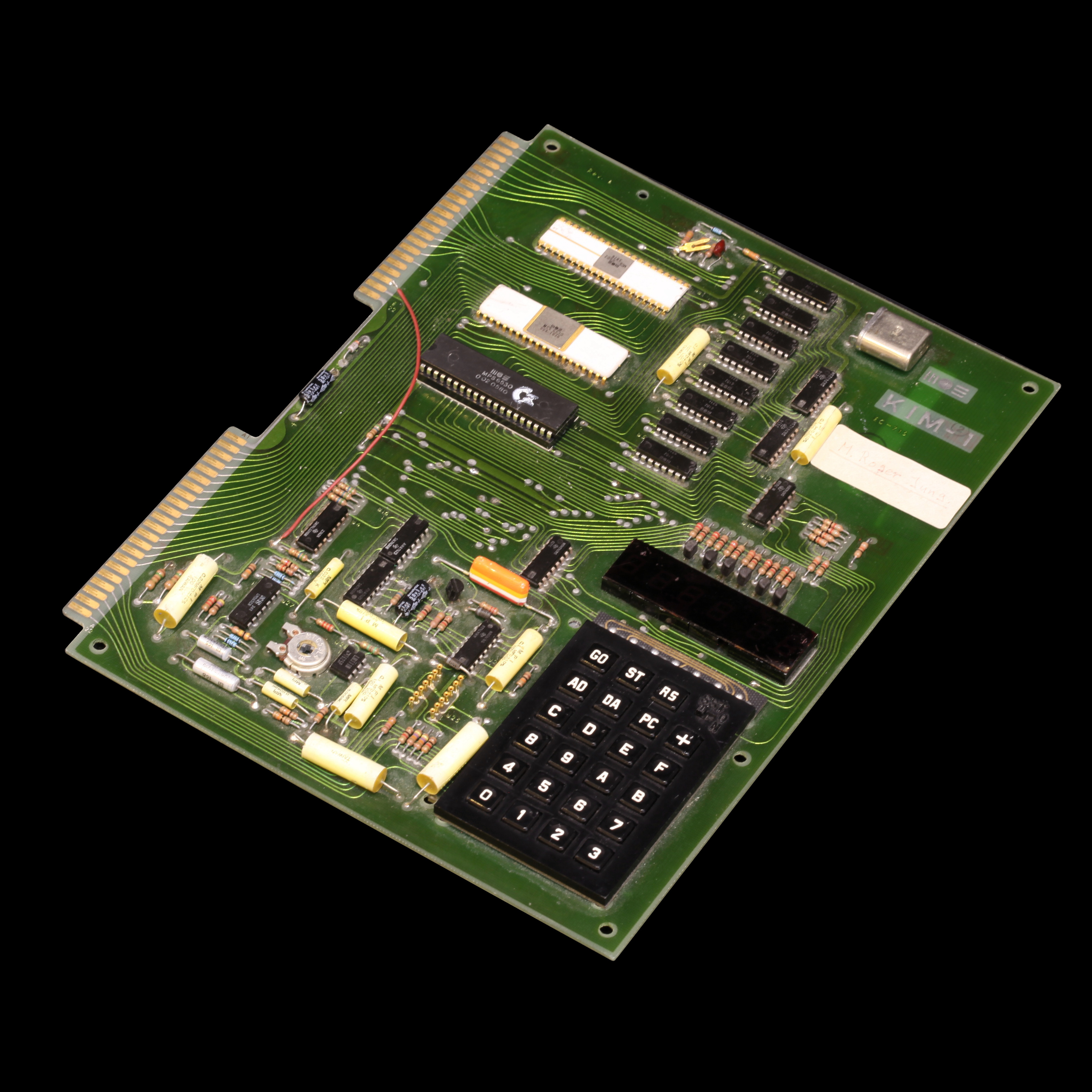
The KIM-1 blurred the line between trainers and single board computers, seeing extensive use in both roles.

During the 1970s, the introduction of low-cost microprocessors led to a third major wave of trainers. Examples include the Motorola 6800-based Heathkit ET-3400 Microcomputer Learning System and the Radio Shack Science Fair Microcomputer Trainer Kit (a variant of the Japanese FX-Micom R-165). During this period, trainers also took on a second role as prototyping systems to introduce new microprocessors to potential users. These systems tended to be more powerful and overlapped in concept with prototyping systems and single board computers. Examples include the KIM-1 and the OSI 300, both based on the MOS 6502. Practically every company had a similar system.
