= SBC Long Distance =

SBC Long Distance, LLC
- Trade name: AT&T Long Distance
- Company type: Holding of AT&T
- Industry: Telecommunications
- Founded: 1996
- Headquarters: San Antonio, Texas, USA
- Website: AT&T Long Distance

SBC Long Distance LLC is a long-distance telephone company owned by AT&T that does business as AT&T Long Distance. SBC Long Distance competes with other long-distance providers who provide service within some of the Bell Operating Company service boundaries of AT&T. SBC Long Distance is a separate subsidiary than AT&T Communications, the incumbent long-distance carrier for most of the country acquired in the SBC merger with AT&T.

SBC Long Distance started in 1996 as Southwestern Bell Communications Services, Inc., created as a result of the Telecommunications Act of 1996 which allowed the Baby Bells to compete for telephone service. In 2002, SWB Long Distance was renamed SBC Long Distance, as part of SBC's brand unification among its companies. In 2005, SBC purchased AT&T, and changed its name to AT&T. On April 1, 2006, SBC Long Distance began doing business as AT&T Long Distance.

SBC Long Distance provides competitive long-distance service within the Bell Operating Company regions of Illinois Bell, Indiana Bell, Michigan Bell, Nevada Bell, Ohio Bell, Pacific Bell, Southwestern Bell, and Wisconsin Bell. SBC Long Distance does not provide service for BellSouth Telecommunications customers, who are served by BellSouth Long Distance.

SBC did not maintain an actual long-distance network and instead relies on a smaller telecommunications company, Level 3 Communications, to provide service. SBC initially created the agreement with Level 3 Communications predecessor company Williams Communication in 1999 and soon begin to provide long-distance service to SBC's wireless subsidiary Cellular One/SBC Wireless and Ameritech Cellular, until SBC long Distance became fully developed.

== Future ==
On June 15, 2005, SBC and Wiltel (new name of Williams Communications) announced an agreement on altering the two companies’ agreement. In this new agreement, Wiltel will help SBC transition off its network to the soon to be acquired AT&T's legacy networks.

It is still uncertain if AT&T expects to incorporate SBC Long Distance into AT&T Communications, a complete long-distance operator. Since AT&T Long Distance provides only CSM/Billing and may only need to tap into AT&T Communications network resources.

== See also ==
- AT&T Long Lines
