= Multi-Environment Real-Time =

Unix variant with real-time operating system capabilities

- Developer: Bell Labs
- Written in: C
- OS family: Unix-like
- Working state: UNIX-RTR/3B21D version still in use.
- Marketing target: Real-time computing applications
- Available in: English
- Platforms: PDP-11, 3B20D, 3B21D
- Kernel type: Microkernel RTOS

Multi-Environment Real-Time (MERT), later renamed UNIX Real-Time (UNIX-RT), is a hybrid time-sharing and real-time operating system developed in the 1970s at Bell Labs for use in embedded minicomputers (especially PDP-11s). A version named Duplex Multi Environment Real Time (DMERT) was the operating system for the AT&T 3B20D telephone switching minicomputer, designed for high availability; DMERT was later renamed Unix RTR (Real-Time Reliable).

A generalization of Bell Labs' time-sharing operating system Unix, MERT featured a redesigned, modular kernel that was able to run Unix programs and privileged real-time computing processes. These processes' data structures were isolated from other processes with message passing being the preferred form of interprocess communication (IPC), although shared memory was also implemented. MERT also had a custom file system with special support for large, contiguous, statically sized files, as used in real-time database applications. The design of MERT was influenced by Dijkstra's THE, Hansen's Monitor, and IBM's CP-67.

The MERT operating system was a four-layer design, in decreasing order of protection:

- Kernel: resource allocation of memory, CPU time and interrupts
- Kernel-mode processes including input/output (I/O) device drivers, file manager, swap manager, root process that connects the file manager to the disk (usually combined with the swap manager)
- Operating system supervisor
- User processes

The standard supervisor was MERT/UNIX, a Unix emulator with an extended system call interface and shell that enabled the use of MERT's custom IPC mechanisms, although an RSX-11 emulator also existed.
