= MK-DOS =

Operating system

- Developer: Mikhail Korolev, Dmitriy Butyrskiy, A. Panfilov
- Working state: Abandoned (?)
- Source model: written in assembler and/or debugger
- Latest release: 3.18 / 18.09.2020
- Supported platforms: Elektronika BK (PDP-11 architecture)
- Default user interface: Micro Commander dual-panel graphical file manager
- License: Freeware
- Official website: http://mkdos.pdp-11.ru/

MK-DOS was one of the most widespread operating systems for Elektronika BK personal computers, developed by Mikhail Korolev and Dmitriy Butyrskiy from 1993. Like ANDOS, the system provided full compatibility for all models, emulating the BK-0010 environments on the more modern BK-0011 and BK-0011M machines. All program requests to a magnetic tape (if they were made through proper ROM functions) were redirected to the disk.

The system supported up to 4 physical disk drives (the actual number was limited by the disk ROM installed) and as many hard disk partitions as the number of letters in the Latin alphabet, which could be used as separate logical drives, each with a volume of up to 32 MB. Starting from version 3.0 the system also supported mounting disk images as logical drives. When booted on a BK-0011 or BK-0011M the system automatically created a RAM disk in the computer's memory.

The most widespread file system along MK-DOS users was MicroDOS. It did not support file fragmentation (like the file system used with RT-11) and required frequent spatial reallocation to maintain optimum contiguous free space (RT-11 users would use the 'SQUEEZE' command, which worked the same way as the *COMPACT command on Acorn's DFS for the BBC Micro). Although MK-DOS was incompatible with the RT-11's file system, both shared many principles. MicroDOS' file system had read-only support in ANDOS. The filename length was limited by 14 symbols (the filename extension was not recognized separately and was considered as part of the filename).

A minimal installation of the system took as little as 8 KB of the computer's memory. It had a functional Norton Commander-like file manager called MCommander. It also shipped with a number of utilities including drivers for the RT-11, FAT12 and CSI-DOS file systems as add-ons for the file manager.
