= Drive mapping =

Association of a drive letter with a shared network storage location

Drive mapping is the process of associating a local drive letter with a shared storage area on a remote computer (often called a file server) over a computer network. Once a drive has been mapped, applications on the client computer can read and write files on the remote storage as if it were a locally attached hard disk drive, using the assigned letter in file paths.

Drive mapping is primarily a concept in MS-DOS and Microsoft Windows, where storage locations are identified by drive letters (A–Z). Unix and Linux systems do not use drive letters; instead, remote file systems are mounted at a point within the directory tree.

== Drive letters and paths ==
In Windows, the first few drive letters are conventionally reserved: A: and B: were historically assigned to removable floppy disk drives, C: is typically the primary internal hard disk, and D: is often an optical drive. Network mapped drives are assigned letters from E: onwards by convention, though any unused letter may be used.

Once mapped, a drive and its subdirectories can be referenced in the standard path format, for example: Z:\Shared Documents\Finance

== Protocols ==
Drive mapping over a local area network (LAN) typically uses the Server Message Block (SMB) protocol on Windows, or the Network File System (NFS) protocol on Unix and Linux. Drive mapping over the internet commonly uses the WebDAV protocol, which is supported on Windows, macOS and Linux.

Mapped network drives are available only while the host file server is online. Access to mapped drives is governed by permissions set on the server; users require the appropriate authorisation to read or write files.

== See also ==
- Mount (computing)
- Drive letter assignment
- SUBST
- Network File System
- Server Message Block
