= CSI-DOS =

- Working state: Abandoned
- Latest release: not less 3.32
- Platforms: Elektronika BK (PDP-11 architecture)
- Default user interface: X-Shell graphical file manager
- License: Proprietary

CSI-DOS is an operating system, created in Samara, for the Soviet Elektronika BK-0011M and Elektronika BK-0011 microcomputers. CSI-DOS did not support the earlier BK-0010. CSI-DOS used its own unique file system and only supported a color graphics video mode. The system supported both hard and floppy drives as well as RAM disks in the computer's memory. It also included software to work with the AY-3-8910 and AY-3-8912 music co-processors, and the Covox Speech Thing. There are a number of games and demos designed specially for the system.

The system also included a Turbo Vision-like application programming interface (API) allowing simpler design of user applications, and a graphical file manager called X-Shell.
