= AutoRun =

Components of the Microsoft Windows OS

AutoRun and the companion feature AutoPlay are components of the Microsoft Windows operating system that dictate what actions the system takes when a drive is mounted.

AutoRun was introduced in Windows 95 to ease application installation for non-technical users and reduce the cost of software support calls. When an appropriately configured CD-ROM is inserted into a CD-ROM drive, Windows detects the arrival and checks the contents for a special file containing a set of instructions. For a CD containing software, these instructions normally initiate installation of the software from the CD-ROM onto the hard drive. To maximise the likelihood of installation success, AutoRun also acts when the drive is accessed ("double-clicked") in Windows Explorer (or "My Computer").

Until the introduction of Windows XP, the terms AutoRun and AutoPlay were used interchangeably, developers often using the former term and end users the latter. This tendency is reflected in Windows Policy settings named AutoPlay that change Windows Registry entries named AutoRun, and in the autorun.inf file which causes "AutoPlay" to be added to drives’ context menus. The terminology was of little importance until the arrival of Windows XP and its addition of a new feature to assist users in selecting appropriate actions when new media and devices were detected. This new feature was called AutoPlay and a differentiation between the two terms was created.

AutoRun, introduced in Windows 95, enables media and devices to launch programs by use of command listed in a file called autorun.inf, stored in the root directory of the medium.

Primarily used on installation CD-ROMs, the applications called are usually application installers. The autorun.inf file can also specify an icon which will represent the device visually in Explorer along with other advanced features.

The terms AutoRun and AutoPlay tend to be interchangeably used when referring to the initiating action, the action that detects and starts reading from discovered volumes. AutoRun is positioned as a layer between AutoPlay and the Shell Hardware Detection service which may help in understanding the terminology. However, to avoid confusion, this article uses the term AutoRun when referring to the initiating action.

== AutoPlay ==
AutoPlay in Windows 8 and later

AutoPlay in Windows Vista

AutoPlay is a feature introduced in Windows XP which examines removable media and devices and, based on content such as pictures, music or video files, launches an appropriate application to play or display the content. If available, settings in an autorun.inf file can add to the options presented to the user.

AutoPlay is based on a set of handler applications registered with the AutoPlay system. Each media type (Pictures, Music, Video) can have a set of registered handlers which can deal with playing or display that type of media.

Each hardware device can have a default action occurring on discovery of a particular media type, or the AutoPlay dialog can prompt the user what action to take.

== AutoRun activation ==
The AutoRun sequence starts with the initial discovery of a new device or new piece of media. Following this, notification of interested parties occurs, of which the Windows Explorer shell is of primary interest. After checking certain Registry settings to see if AutoRun can proceed, parsing of an optional autorun.inf may occur and any necessary actions are taken.

The initial sequence is handled much the same in every version of Windows from Windows 95. However, the way the autorun.inf file is read and acted upon and the level of integration of AutoRun with AutoPlay has changed significantly from the time AutoPlay was introduced in Windows XP until the present handling in Windows 7. In Windows 10, Microsoft has added the option to enable autorun in its settings. Not only users can turn it on but also they can choose specific external devices for autoplay.

=== Initiation and notification ===
When a device with AutoRun-compatible drivers receives new media, a "Media Change Notification" event occurs. The Windows OS then notifies interested applications that a device change has occurred. The notification method used can change depending on the device type.

If the device changed is a volume (like a CD) or a port (like a serial port) Windows broadcasts a WM_DEVICECHANGE notification to all top-level windows. Windows calls this a "basic" notification. A top-level window is one which is a descendant of the desktop.

However, if the device changed is not one of these types an application can use the RegisterDeviceNotification function to register to receive device notifications.

An article on the CodeProject website, "Detecting Hardware Insertion and/or Removal", with clarifications from a blog by Doran Holan is of particular technical interest here.

Non-volume devices are those devices that do not appear as drive letters in "My Computer". These are not handled by any part of AutoRun - any actions taken for these devices are taken either by device specific software or by AutoPlay. See AutoPlay#Devices that are not drives.

When Explorer receives notification of a volume change, it performs a number of actions:

1. Checks to see if AutoRun has been disabled through the Registry. If AutoRun is disabled for that drive or drive type, Explorer does not proceed further. There have been bugs in this area.
2. Checks that the root directory of the inserted media contains an autorun.inf file, which might be read. See below.
3. Sends a QueryCancelAutoPlay message to the foreground window. An application which has registered its interest in receiving this message using RegisterWindowMessage can respond to this message to halt AutoRun (and thus AutoPlay) at this point. Any application, foreground or not, can also be notified by using the IQueryCancelAutoPlay COM interface available in Windows XP and later.
4. Alters double-click and contextual menu behaviours. When a user double clicks on the drive icon in Explorer or right clicks to get a context menu, what happens is fully programmable by settings in the autorun.inf file.
5. Adds an autorun.inf controllable icon and descriptive text to the drive icon.
6. Checks to see if the ⇧ Shift key is held down. If it is then Windows Vista (and later Windows versions) will invoke the AutoPlay dialog regardless of settings to the contrary. Previous versions of Windows will not continue with the process.
7. Finally, if this point has been reached, either:
  - takes no further action.
  - executes the "AutoRun task", the application optionally specified in the open or shellexecute keys in an autorun.inf's [autorun] section.
  - invokes AutoPlay.
  Which choice is made depends on the version of Windows in use, instructions from the autorun.inf if available and the type of the media discovered.

=== Changing behaviour ===
==== Before AutoPlay ====
On Windows versions prior to Windows XP, an autorun.inf file on any drive type will be read and its instructions followed. The AutoRun task, if specified, is executed immediately without user interaction. This includes DRIVE_REMOVABLE, DRIVE_FIXED and DRIVE_REMOTE drive types.

AutoRun will work with network drives (the DRIVE_REMOTE drive type) that are mapped to a drive letter. AutoRun will also work with floppy drives that are provided with autorun-compatible drivers.

The default Registry settings on Windows versions prior to Windows XP (See NoDriveTypeAutoRun), disable Remote and Removable drives from AutoRun initiation, leaving Fixed and CDROM drive types active by default.

==== Introducing AutoPlay ====
With the introduction of AutoPlay in Windows XP, the final stage action (stage 7 above) for some drive types changed from executing an application to invoking AutoPlay. From Windows Vista, the AutoPlay system is integrated into every aspect of media handling and there is no automatic execution of the AutoRun task.

The default Registry settings add Removable drives to those that initiated AutoRun. In Windows XP and higher, except Windows Server 2003, only the Unknown and Remote drive types are not active for AutoRun.

The handling of the autorun.inf file changes very significantly between each Windows version. The details can be found in the autorun.inf article. The current handling in Windows 7 is that only drives of type DRIVE_CDROM may specify an AutoRun task, alter double-click behaviour or change context menus.

== Registry settings ==
AutoRun consults Windows Registry values to decide whether to initiate actions for any particular drive or drive type. These values can be changed using several methods, one of which is using Group Policy.

The primary relevant Registry entry names are NoDriveTypeAutoRun and NoDriveAutoRun. These exist in both per-machine and per-user settings and their location and priority in the Registry are described in further detail below.

=== Drive types ===
The drive types are distinguished by Type Name as follows:

Type name	value	Description
DRIVE_UNKNOWN	0x00000000	The drive-type could not be determined (generic drive)
DRIVE_NO_ROOT_DIR	0x00000001	The drive is currently invalid (no mounted volumes)
DRIVE_REMOVABLE	0x00000002	The drive has removable media (floppy drive, USB flash drive)
DRIVE_FIXED	0x00000003	The disk cannot be removed from the drive (hard disk/solid state drive)
DRIVE_REMOTE	0x00000004	The drive is a remote (network) drive
DRIVE_CDROM	0x00000005	The drive is a CD-ROM, DVD-ROM or BD-ROM drive
DRIVE_RAMDISK	0x00000006	The drive is a RAM disk
DRIVE_NOT_DETERMINED	0x00000007	The drive has not yet been determined
DRIVE_NOT_FOUND	0x00000008	The drive currently can't be accessed (detached drives)
[RESERVED]	0x00000009	This value reserved for future-technologies

=== Registry terminology ===
The Windows Registry is a hierarchical database that stores configuration settings and options for the operating system. The terminology is somewhat misleading so it is briefly summarised here.

A Registry key is similar to a folder that, in addition to values, each key can contain subkeys which in turn may contain subkeys, and so on.

A Registry value consists of a name-data pair. Microsoft documentation commonly uses the term "entry" as an equivalent term. It also uses "value" for "data" when it is obvious what is meant. To avoid confusion, this article always uses the term "entry" when referring to the name-data pair.

Two Registry keys that are very commonly referred to are HKEY_LOCAL_MACHINE which contains per-machine settings, and HKEY_CURRENT_USER which contains settings for the currently logged-on user. These are almost always abbreviated as HKLM and HKCU respectively. There may be many users of a machine; their settings are stored in HKEY_USERS, HKCU is actually just a link to the appropriate place in HKEY_USERS.

=== Changing Registry settings ===
Registry settings may be changed directly by using the GUI regedit tool or the command line reg.exe utility. Settings can also be placed in a text file, named with a .reg extension type. For example, "mychanges.reg". When the file is double clicked, the settings in the file are entered into the Registry, permissions allowing.

They can be changed indirectly by using Group Policy, applied locally to a single computer with GPEdit.msc or to a domain with gpmc.msc.

It may be necessary to either logout or restart the computer in order for any Registry changes to take effect.

=== Evaluation order ===
The NoDriveAutoRun and NoDriveTypeAutoRun Registry entries can exist in two places, the per-user setting (under HKEY_CURRENT_USER) and the per-machine setting (under HKEY_LOCAL_MACHINE). If an entry appears under HKEY_LOCAL_MACHINE, then any corresponding entry under HKEY_CURRENT_USER is completely ignored. The data values are not merged in any way.

When deciding whether to activate AutoRun, both NoDriveAutoRun and NoDriveTypeAutoRun Registry entries are consulted. If either value indicates a drive should be disabled then AutoRun is disabled for that drive.

Thus in the following example:

HKEY_LOCAL_MACHINE		HKEY_CURRENT_USER	
NoDriveAutoRun	NoDriveTypeAutoRun	NoDriveAutoRun	NoDriveTypeAutoRun
0x08	(Not Present)	0x03FFFFFF	0x95

the data value taken for NoDriveAutoRun is 0x08, disabling drive D and the data value taken for NoDriveTypeAutoRun is 0x95, disabling removable and network drives. The per-user NoDriveAutoRun entry is never used.

=== NoDriveTypeAutoRun ===
HKLM\Software\Microsoft\Windows\CurrentVersion\Policies\Explorer; HKCU\Software\Microsoft\Windows\CurrentVersion\Policies\Explorer
Entry name	Data type	Range	Default
NoDriveTypeAutoRun	REG_DWORD	0x00 to 0xFF	0x95 or 0x91

This Registry entry disables or enables the AutoRun feature on all drives of the type specified. It reflects the setting of the relevant Autoplay Group Policy. Valid data ranges from 0x00 to 0xFF in hexadecimal notation. If the entry is not present, the default data value is either 0x95 or 0x91 depending on the version of Windows used. An entry present in HKLM overrides any entry present in HKCU.

The entry data is a bitmapped value, where a bit set to 1 disables AutoRun on a particular type of drive. The bit settings for each type of drive are shown below:

drive type bitwise settings

Note that bit number 1 is unused and that the "Unknown" type is represented twice. Setting all bits to 1 would give a hexadecimal value of 0xFF, decimal 255, and would disable AutoRun on all types of drives.

The default setting for this entry depends on the version of Windows being used:

Operating system	Default setting
Windows 7	0x91
Windows Server 2008	0x91
Windows Vista	0x91
Windows Server 2003	0x95
Windows XP	0x91
Windows 2000	0x95
Windows 95/98	0x95

=== NoDriveAutoRun ===
HKLM\Software\Microsoft\Windows\CurrentVersion\Policies\Explorer; HKCU\Software\Microsoft\Windows\CurrentVersion\Policies\Explorer
Entry name	Data type	Range	Default
NoDriveAutoRun	REG_DWORD	0x0 to 0x03FFFFFF	0x0

This Registry entry disables or enables the AutoRun feature on individual drives. It is not associated with a Group Policy and does not exist by default. The data value is taken to be 0 if the entry is not present. An entry present in HKLM overrides any entry present in HKCU.

The data is a 32 bit (DWORD) bitmapped value, of which the lower 26 bits are used to represent each of the 26 drive letters from A to Z. Thus the valid data range is from 0x0 to 0x03FFFFFF. The least significant bit (the right most bit) represents drive A, and the 26th bit from the right represents drive Z.

A bit set to 1 disables AutoRun on a particular drive. For example, if the data value is set to 0x8 (1000 binary), AutoRun is disabled on drive D.

== Group Policy ==
The Group Policy settings dialog box on Windows XP showing option to turn off AutoPlay

The only Group Policy settings available for AutoRun affect the NoDriveTypeAutoRun Registry entries. The policy is available on either a per-machine or a per-user basis reflecting the Registry entry location in either HKLM or HKCU. As described above, a per-machine policy setting will cause the per-user policy setting to be ignored.

When a policy is Enabled, Group Policy will add the NoDriveTypeAutoRun entry to the Registry. If the policy is Disabled or set to Not configured, Group Policy deletes this entry from the Registry for the Machine policy (in HKLM) and sets it back to system defaults value for the User policy (in HKCU). System defaults may then take effect as described in the NoDriveTypeAutoRun section.

The policy names, locations and possible settings vary slightly between Windows versions. The list of settings are relatively short and are always additional to the system default setting. Therefore, on Windows 2000, enabling the "Disable Autoplay" policy and setting it to "CD-ROM drives", disables AutoRun (as distinct from AutoPlay) for CD-ROM and DVD drives, removable drives, network drives, and drives of unknown type.

This setting cannot be used to enable AutoRun on drives on which it is disabled by default or disable AutoRun for drives not listed. To disable or enable any particular drives or drive types, the Registry must be edited manually.

=== Windows Server 2003, Windows XP, and Windows 2000 ===
The per-machine policy location is:

Group Policy \ Computer Configuration \ Administrative Templates \ System

The per-user policy location is:

Group Policy \ User Configuration \ Administrative Templates \ System

The relevant policy is "Turn off Autoplay". In Windows 2000 the policy is called "Disable Autoplay" instead.

Once the policy is Enabled it can be set to "All drives" or "CD-ROM drives". The latter setting adds CD-ROM drives to the existing list of disabled drive types as described above.

=== Windows Vista, Windows Server 2008 ===
The per-machine policy location is:

Computer Configuration \ Administrative Templates \ Windows Components \ Autoplay Policies

The per-user policy location is:

User Configuration \ Administrative Templates \ Windows Components \ AutoPlay Policies

The relevant policy is "Turn off Autoplay" and can be set for CD-ROM, DVD-ROM and removable drives or all drives.

Two related policies were added in Vista and Server 2008:

Default behavior for AutoRun

HKLM\Software\Microsoft\Windows\CurrentVersion\Policies\Explorer; HKCU\Software\Microsoft\Windows\CurrentVersion\Policies\Explorer
Entry name	Data type	Range	Default
NoAutoRun	REG_DWORD		

Sets the default behavior for AutoRun commands found in autorun.inf files.
Prior to Windows Vista, when media containing an autorun.inf specifying an AutoRun task was :inserted, the default action was to automatically execute the program without user intervention. :From Windows Vista the default behaviour is to invoke AutoPlay and represent the AutoRun task as :one of the dialog options. This is also the behaviour when this policy is Not configured or :Disabled.

If this policy is Enabled, the behaviour can be changed to either:
- Completely disable autorun.inf commands or
- Automatically execute the autorun.inf command as per previous Windows versions.

Don't set the always do this checkbox

HKLM\Software\Microsoft\Windows\CurrentVersion\Policies\Explorer; HKCU\Software\Microsoft\Windows\CurrentVersion\Policies\Explorer
Entry name	Data type	Range	Default
DontSetAutoplayCheckbox	REG_DWORD		

If this policy is Enabled, the "Always do this..." checkbox in the AutoPlay dialog will not be set :by default when the dialog is shown.

=== Windows 7, Windows Server 2008 R2 ===
In these versions of Windows, the ability of an autorun.inf file to set an AutoRun task, alter double-click behaviour or change context menus is restricted to drives of type DRIVE_CDROM. There are no policy settings that will override this behaviour. Policy locations and settings are as per Windows Vista, Windows Server 2008 above with the addition of:

Turn off Autoplay for non-volume devices

HKLM\Software\Policies\Microsoft\Windows\Explorer; HKCU\Software\Policies\Microsoft\Windows\Explorer
Entry name	Data type	Range	Default
NoAutoplayfornonVolume			

If this policy is enabled, AutoPlay will be disabled for non-volume devices.

== Altering AutoRun behaviour ==
=== Pressing the Shift key ===
If the ⇧ Shift key is held down at a certain point in the execution sequence, Windows Vista invokes the AutoPlay dialog regardless of any AutoPlay settings to the contrary. Previous versions of Windows do not execute the AutoRun task. It is essential that the left Shift key is used for this purpose as holding down the right Shift key for eight seconds invokes FilterKeys.

Given that Shift must be held down until Windows checks for it, it may be a considerable amount of time before it becomes effective. The time taken primarily depends on the time to recognise the new hardware and the time taken for CD-ROMs to spin up. It is unsafe to rely on this method.

=== Auto Insert Notification ===
Certain Media Change Notification events may be suppressed by altering certain Registry entries. "Media Change Notification" is the generic term; for CD-ROM drives, the specific term is "Auto Insert Notification".

HKLM\SYSTEM\CurrentControlSet\Services\Cdrom
Entry name	Data type	Range	Default
AutoRun	REG_DWORD	0 or 1	1

For CD-ROM drives, changing the value of this Registry entry to 0 will disable Auto Insert Notification for CD-ROM drives only. A Windows restart will be necessary.

Data value	Meaning
0	Does not send an MCN message
1	Sends an MCN message

Under Windows 95/98/ME, this setting can be changed under Device Manager, accessible from the System icon in Control Panel.

AutoRun settings for CD-ROM drive on Windows 98

Although the Registry entry is named "AutoRun", it only suppresses the MCN message. The MCN message does trigger AutoRun initiation but it also instructs the Explorer shell to update its views and contents.

Thus, as a side effect only, this disables AutoRun for CD-ROM drives. However, Explorer will now not update its view when a new CD is inserted; it will show the contents of the previous CD until F5 is pressed or View/Refresh is selected from the Explorer menu. This could result in severe confusion for users.

For this reason the Media Change Notification message should not be disabled unless there is absolutely no alternative; AutoRun can be disabled for individual drives using Group Policy or the Registry.

HKLM\SYSTEM\CurrentControlSet\Services\Cdrom
Entry name	Data type
AutoRunAlwaysDisable	REG_MULTI_SZ

This entry is used to suppress the MCN message for specifically listed type of CD-ROM drive, primarily CD-ROM changers. The data is a set of device identifiers, which matches those identifiers reported to the system by the devices themselves.

The default value for this entry consists of products identified by Microsoft testing as being unable to support AutoRun. This entry should not be altered from its default.

=== Editing Group Policy ===
AutoRun may be suppressed on particular drives and drive types by using the methods described in the Group Policy section. However, the Group Policy Editor is not available on Home versions of Windows XP and does not provide any fine-grained drive selection facilities.

However, Group Policy would be the accepted method of disabling AutoRun on an entire Windows domain.

=== Registry files ===
A Registry setting file can be created that, when executed, makes the desired changes in the Registry.

Windows Registry Editor Version 5.00

[HKEY_LOCAL_MACHINE\Software\Microsoft\Windows\CurrentVersion\policies\Explorer]
"NoDriveTypeAutoRun"=dword:000000ff

Note that the actual file should always end with a blank line. This is not optional.

In the above example, AutoRun would be disabled for all drives and for all users. This example would need to be run as Administrator and a reboot would be needed for the setting to take complete effect.

=== Initialization file mapping ===
Windows Vista and later versions of Windows have a policy setting, "Default behavior for AutoRun", that can be set to disallow the reading of an autorun.inf file on any volume. This avoids certain scenarios where malware leverages autorun.inf functionality to infect a machine. Previous versions of Windows do not have this policy setting but the use of initialisation file mapping is an effective workaround.

As an autorun.inf file is a standard Windows INI file, the appropriate API calls are used by Windows when fetching its settings. These API calls can be redirected using the INI file mapping method. The following Registry file illustrates the workaround, where all autorun.inf settings are taken solely from the HKEY_LOCAL_MACHINE\Software\DoesNotExist Registry key:

Windows Registry Editor Version 5.00

[HKEY_LOCAL_MACHINE\SOFTWARE\Microsoft\Windows NT\CurrentVersion\IniFileMapping\Autorun.inf]
@="@SYS:DoesNotExist"

As this key does not exist, it is as if the autorun.inf file contains no settings information. This applies to any autorun.inf in any location and on any drive.

Since either the policy setting or this workaround disable autorun, installation of software from an autorunning install CD or DVD will obviously no longer be automatic. It will be necessary to view the CD's autorun.inf file and then execute the appropriate install program manually.

== Issues and security ==
Microsoft recognized that "Because code may be executed without user's knowledge or consent, users may want to disable this feature because of security concerns." and released a "Fixit" to disable AutoRun for users not comfortable with editing the registry.

=== The AutoRun disable bug ===
From Windows 2000 through to Windows Server 2008, AutoRun-relevant Registry entries were not handled properly leading to a security vulnerability. Windows 95 and Windows 98 were not affected.

When AutoRun is disabled, Windows should not proceed further through the activation sequence than the Registry check. However, it parses any autorun.inf found and does everything except the final action to invoke AutoPlay or execute an application.

This leaves the user open to attack from malware which uses the autorun.inf to alter the double-click and contextual menu behaviours. Double clicking the drive icon will infect the machine. Right Clicking and selecting the "Explore" or "Open" options from the context menu is not a workaround as these menu items can be coopted by the appropriate autorun.inf entries.

This bug was fixed in a number of security updates, detailed in Microsoft Knowledge Base article 967715.

=== Other issues ===
- If one adds the computer to an Active Directory domain, the NoDriveTypeAutoRun value may be reset to a default value. This is due to Group Policy settings in the domain taking effect. This is not a bug.
- Some programs may deliberately change AutoRun Registry settings. Early versions of CD burning software like Roxio have been known to change settings in this way.
- If the Group Policy "Restrict CD-ROM access to locally logged-on user only" security option under:
  Computer Configuration\Windows Settings\Security Settings\Local Policies\Security Options
  is turned on (Enabled), then AutoRun may not function.
  Windows Installers will also malfunction because "Local System" access to the CD-ROM will be denied.
  This Group Policy setting reflects the value of the Registry entry:
  HKLM\Software\Microsoft\Windows NT\CurrentVersion\Winlogon
  Entry name	Data type	Range	Default
  allocatecdroms	REG_SZ	0 or 1	0
  and should be set to 0.
- RealPlayer 10 interferes with AutoPlay functionality to the extent that it may look as if AutoRun or AutoPlay is not working at all.

=== Attack vectors ===
AutoRun functionality has been used as a malware vector for some time. Prior to Windows Vista, the default action with a CD-ROM drive type was to follow any autorun.inf file instructions without prompts or warnings. This makes rogue CD-ROMs one possible infection vector.

In the same category are mixed content CD-ROMs. An audio CD, that a user would not expect to contain software at all, can contain a data section with an autorun.inf. Some companies, such as Sony BMG, have used this vector to install malware that attempts to protect against copying of the audio tracks.

U3 enabled flash drives, by emulating a CD-ROM unit, can also cause Windows to execute commands from the autorun.inf found on the emulated CD-ROM.

Devices like the Huawei E220 HSDPA modem validly use this method to autoinstall drivers for the modem itself. However, plugging in a flash drive from an unknown source is an unwise move. USB Switchblade and similar tools have made U3 flash drive attacks trivial. Given the ease of writing script based attacks, anti-virus software may be ineffective in preventing data and password stealing.

The Conficker worm in action screenshot on Windows 7

With a standard flash drive, social engineering attacks can be employed to entice a user to click on the appropriate item in the AutoPlay dialog. An alluring action string promising free games or pornography would lure many users into the trap. At any time, double clicking on the drive icon will use the autorun.inf automatically, a trap more advanced users could fall into.

Any user can configure AutoPlay to make various decisions for them; by checking the appropriate box in the AutoPlay dialog, running flash drive malware becomes silent and automatic.

AutoRun malware has been extended to use hard drives, picture frames and other digital devices. Care in dealing with external devices is a security priority. The prevalence of malware infection by means of AutoRun and USB flash drive was documented in a 2011 Microsoft study analyzing data from more than 600 million systems worldwide in the first half of 2011. The study found that 26 percent of all malware infections of Windows system were due to USB flash drives exploiting the AutoRun feature in Microsoft Windows. That finding was in line with other statistics, such as the monthly reporting of most commonly detected malware by antivirus company ESET, which lists abuse of autorun.inf as first among the top ten threats in 2011.

=== Attack mitigation ===
In addition to basic security precautions, which include

- following the principle of least privilege by not habitually running with Administrator privileges and
- applying all relevant security patches and updates,

exposure to these attacks can be minimised through the appropriate use of Group Policy and Registry settings. The following security policies are a summary of those described within this article:

- Disable AutoRun (but see the AutoRun disable bug)
- Use the "Default behavior for AutoRun" Group Policy under Vista (see above) to disable autorun.inf commands
- Use initialization file mapping to nullify autorun.inf sections
- Under Windows 7, only CD and DVD drives may specify applications like the AutoRun task in the autorun.inf file. Windows XP and later can be patched to behave in the same way with update KB971029. In February 2011, this patch was added to the official Windows Update channel. The Windows 7 AutoRun task behaviour now becomes the default for all current versions of the Windows OS.

In addition, the following actions have been recommended by Microsoft, primarily during the Conficker worm attacks:

- Prevent autorun.inf invocation from network shares by:
  1. Deleting any existing autorun.inf file from the root of a mapped network drive
  2. Denying Create rights to the root of a mapped network drive
- Prevent the use of USB storage devices by means of:
  - USB settings within the System BIOS
  - Appropriate Registry settings as described in Knowledge Base article 823732
  - Setting USB devices to read only to prevent propagation of unknown worms (and theft of proprietary data)

== See also ==
- AutoPlay
- autorun.inf
