= Covox =

American technology company

SRT, Inc.
- Logo of Covox, Inc.
- Trade name: Covox, Inc.
- Industry: Computer; Technology
- Founded: 1975 in Southern California
- Founder: Larry Stewart
- Defunct: July 1994
- Fate: Dissolution
- Headquarters: Eugene, Oregon
- Products: Speech Thing
- Number of employees: 25 (1994)

SRT, Inc., doing business as Covox, Inc., was a small, privately owned American technology company active from 1975 to 1994. The company released a number of sound-generating devices for microcomputers and personal computers from the 1980s to the 1990s. They are perhaps best known for the Speech Thing, a digital-to-analog converter that plugs into a parallel port of the IBM Personal Computer. Covox was originally based in Southern California but moved their headquarters to Eugene, Oregon, in the early 1980s.

== History ==
SRT, Inc., was founded by Larry Stewart in Southern California in 1975. Stewart had previously worked in the aerospace industry into the 1960s, where he got the idea for Av-Alarm, a sound-generating device intended to scare off birds from outside locations such as vegetable crops and vineyards. SRT relocated to Eugene, Oregon, in 1982, Stewart finding Oregon to be a cheaper state in which to conduct his business. Around this time, he hired his sons Mike Stewart and Brad Stewart to manage the company. Together they established Covox, Inc., a subsidiary of SRT, in 1982; this subsidiary was dedicated to audio products for microcomputers and personal computers and soon after subsumed the SRT name. Brad Stewart, named the company's vice president, was responsible for the development all of Covox's products. Covox's first product was released in 1984; called the Voice Master, it was a low-cost speech-synthesis board for the Commodore 64, intended for business and education. A successor to this device, the Voice Master II, was released in 1990. By mid-1987, sales of Covox products represented 85 percent of SRT's total sales.

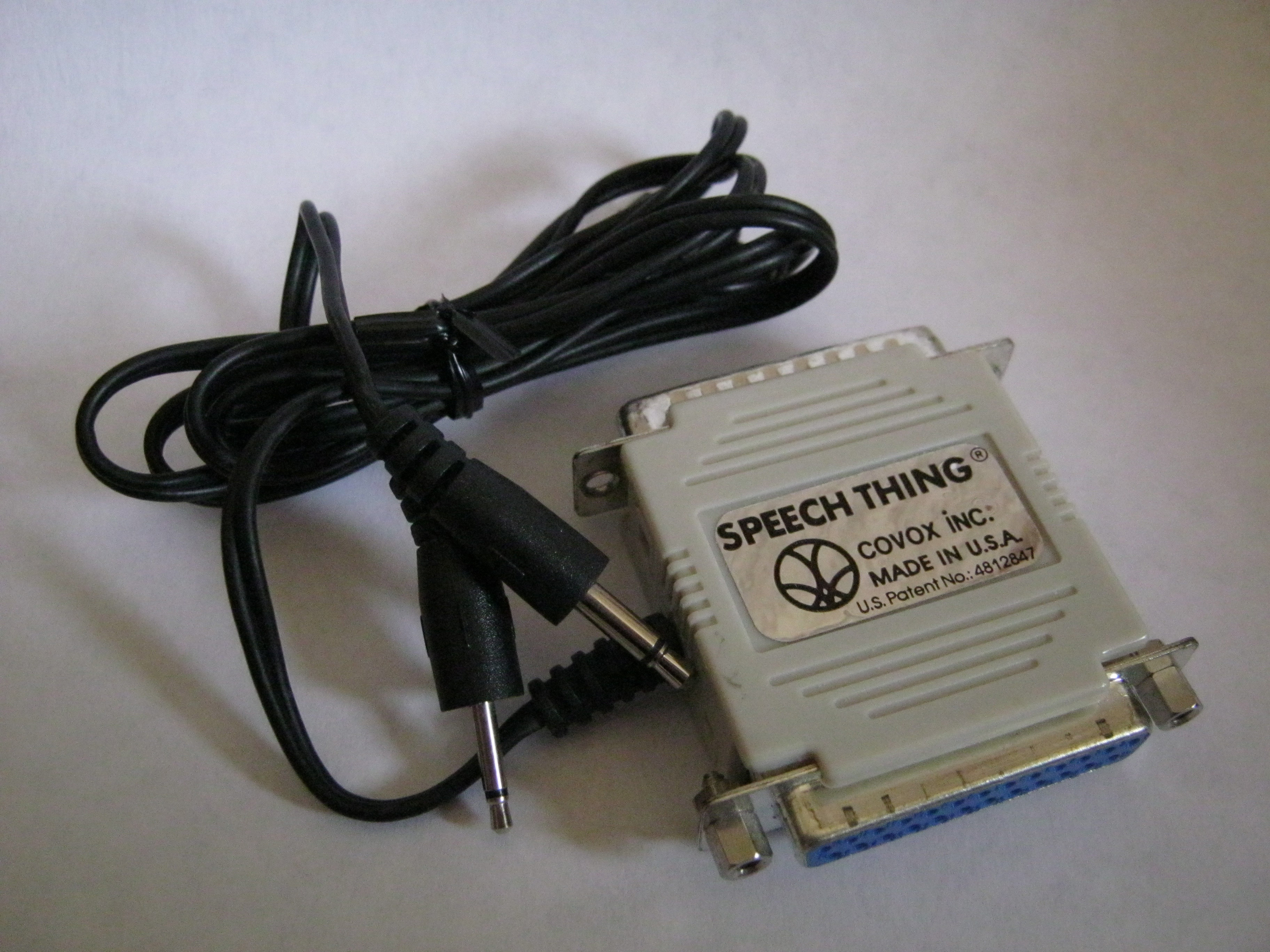
An original Covox Speech Thing from 1987

In late 1987, Covox released the Speech Thing, a simple digital-to-analog converter that plugs into a parallel port of the IBM Personal Computer (and compatibles). It was the first sound device for the IBM PC capable of playing digital audio samples. The Speech Thing initially sold poorly but later found widespread adoption among video game developers and multimedia software authors. Disney Interactive later licensed the technology behind the Speech Thing for their own peripheral, the Disney Sound Source. In 1989, Covox released the Sound Master, a full-fledged sound card based on General Instrument's AY-3-8910 programmable sound generator. It was capable of producing three-voice polyphonic music, unlike the Speech Thing, as well as digital sound effects. The Sound Master sold poorly and lacked the widespread support from software developers that the Speech Thing enjoyed, however. They followed up the Sound Master with the Voice Master Key, a voice recognition suite for IBM PCs and compatibles comprising a specialized sound card, speakers, a microphone, and software.

Between May and September 1989, Covox leased a 17,000-square-foot airplane hangar at the Pearson Airpark in Vancouver, Washington, in order to raise more manufacturing lines beyond their Eugene offices. By 1992, the company employed 23 people, generated $3 million in annual revenue, and had opened an international subsidiary, with a regional office in London. Founder Larry Stewart had retired to Vancouver, Washington, by 1992, leaving his sons as the sole owners of the company. The Stewart family found themselves strapped for cash to expand Covox, but in late 1992 they found an investment company, Sound Trends, Inc., who were willing to invest capital in the company in exchange for a 60-percent controlling interest in Covox. Larry Stewart later alleged that Sound Trends had spent the company's money frivolously, citing a failed advertising campaign costing upwards of $250,000 as an example of this.

Covox's last two years were plagued with lawsuits. In September 1993, Creative Technology sued Covox for alleged trademark infringement of their Sound Blaster line with Covox's Voice Blaster voice-synthesis software. Creative won a settlement against Covox in January 1994. A bevy of Covox's creditors followed suit with lawsuits of their own, including Interactive Products, who co-developed Covox's software; Box Maker and Admiral Printing, who printed and assembled Covox's product boxes and brochures; CMP Publications, who ran advertisements for Covox's products; and more. Amid massive debt to creditors, Covox laid off all remaining 25 employees in July 1994 and exited their Eugene headquarters from which they were evicted. Covox promised to open their doors again after their financial situation was sorted out; however, a revival never came to fruition.
