= Modedit =

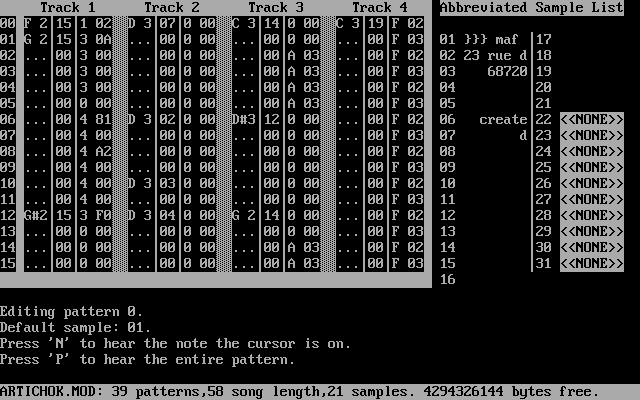
- Screenshot
- Original author: Norman Lin
- Release: 1991; 35 years ago
- Stable release: Version 3.01 / late 1992
- Operating system: MS-DOS
- Type: Tracker
- License: Shareware

Modedit was a MOD file editor (a form of Tracker) for MS-DOS written by Norman Lin and distributed as Shareware in 1991 and 1992. It was one of the first MOD trackers available for the IBM PC compatibles. Its ability to play MODs through the PC speaker without requiring additional sound hardware, was achieved by using code written by Mark J. Cox.

== Releases ==
The most popular version was the initial release, v2.00, in 1991 (v1.0 was a private release). Its screen was divided into three parts: Pattern editor, Pattern sequence table, and Sample list. Navigation around these parts was by keyboard.

Version 3.01 (released late 1992) added a piano roll display and mouse support, but it was less popular. It shipped with a MOD file of "The House of the Rising Sun" as a demonstration.

== Editor ==
The pattern editor showed details of the current pattern in the sequence table. It had 4 columns corresponding to the 4 channels of the MOD file, and each column was divided into 3 smaller columns for pitch (note name and octave number), sample number (corresponding to an entry in the sample list), and special effects code (if any). These values could be edited directly by typing, in a manner reminiscent of a hex editor.
