= PCloud =

Cloud storage and file synchronization service

pCloud International AG
- Founded: 2013; 13 years ago
- Founders: Tunio Zafer and Anton Titov
- Headquarters: Baar, Switzerland, Switzerland
- Area served: Worldwide
- Services: File-hosting service
- Website: www.pcloud.com

pCloud is a Swiss-based cloud storage provider founded in 2013. It offers encrypted file storage, lifetime and subscription payment options, and support across multiple operating systems. pCloud operates from two data centers, located in the United States (Texas) and Luxembourg.

== History ==
pCloud was founded in Switzerland by Tunio Zafer and Anton Titov in 2013. While it operates out of Sofia, Bulgaria, the legal entity pCloud AG is based in Baar. By 2019, it had more than 9 million users. In 2025, it counted over 22 million users.

== Features ==
pCloud is compatible with Windows, macOS, Linux (via AppImage), Android, and iOS. A web-based interface and browser extensions are also available.

pCloud uses TLS/SSL encryption for data in transit. Files are protected with server-side 256-bit AES encryption. It supports file versioning, enabling access to previous versions of stored files. The platform specializes in providing offline access, allowing users to retrieve and manage their files without an active internet connection. pCloud imposes no file-size restrictions on uploads.

A distinctive feature of pCloud is the creation of a virtual drive on a user's device, typically assigned the drive letter "P:" on Windows systems. This virtual drive mirrors the user's cloud account and enables file synchronization without consuming local storage space.

The service supports integration with social media platforms such as Facebook and Instagram, allowing users to back up media directly. It also supports migration from other cloud services, including OneDrive, Dropbox, and Google Drive.

pCloud includes built-in multimedia players, such as an audio player capable of organizing music by artist, album, or folder, and a video player supporting playback speed adjustments and file format conversions.

== Business model ==
pCloud provides 10 GB of free storage to users, with options for additional storage through paid plans. It offers both subscription and lifetime payment models. As of April 2025, the Premium plan was available for a one-time payment of $199 for lifetime access or $50 per year. The Premium Plus plan (2TB) cost $399 for a lifetime subscription or $100 annually. Additional options include business accounts.

== Security ==
pCloud holds ISO 9001:2008 certification for Quality Management Systems and ISO 27001:2013 certification for Information Security Management Systems. It is certified for GDPR compliance and holds SSAE 18 SOC 2 Type II and SSAE 16 SOC 2 Type II compliance certifications. pCloud uses user authentication and two-step verification for account security.

Zero-knowledge encryption, where files placed in a Crypto folder remain inaccessible even to pCloud, is an optional paid add-on.

=== Weaknesses ===
In October 2024, researchers from ETH Zürich reported multiple attacks on the optional encryption, breaking the confidentiality of files, injecting new files, and tampering with file names and file locations. pCloud did not respond to the coordinated disclosure of the researchers (as of October 2024), despite being contacted in April 2024.

== Reception ==
In a 2019 review for PCMag, Michael Muchmore rated pCloud 3.5 out of 5 stars, calling it a "very reasonable service" with competitive pricing, wide device support, and a secure local encryption option. He noted, however, that it lacked the deep OS integration and feature richness of competitors like Google Drive and OneDrive.

TechRadar rated pCloud a 4 out of 5 stars, praising its value, multimedia handling, and secure features, though noting a dated interface and lack of integrated document editing. ZDNet has highlighted pCloud's strong security features, cross-platform compatibility, and adherence to Swiss data privacy laws, describing its lifetime plan as a notable offering. However, it has cautioned that the service may be costly unless users are confident in pCloud's long-term support.

== See also ==
- Remote backup service
- Comparison of file hosting services
- Comparison of online backup services
- List of online backup services
