= ANDOS =

Russian operating system

- Developer: Alexey Nadezhin, Sergey Kamnev (ANCO company)
- Written in: Assembly language
- OS family: DOS
- Working state: Discontinued
- Source model: Closed source
- Initial release: 1992; 34 years ago
- Final release: 3.30 / December 1997; 28 years ago
- Supported platforms: Electronika BK (PDP-11 architecture)
- Kernel type: Monolithic
- Influenced by: MS-DOS
- Default user interface: Disk Master or BK Shell graphical non-windowing file managers
- License: Proprietary, commercial and freeware versions exist, latest version is free for download from the official site
- Official website: df.ru at the Wayback Machine (archived 28 August 2009)

ANDOS is a Russian operating system for Electronika BK series computers: BK-0010, BK-0011, and BK-0011M. They were based on the PDP-11 architecture by Digital Equipment Corporation. ANDOS was created in 1990 and released first in 1992. Initially it was developed by Alexey Nadezhin (by whose name the system is named) and later also by Sergey Kamnev, who joined the project. It was the only widespread system on BK series computers that used MS-DOS-compatible file system format. ANDOS used the FAT12 file system on 800 Kb floppy disks. For Electronika BK-0011M and BK-0011, ANDOS could emulate a BK-0010 by loading a BK-0010 read-only memory (ROM) image into BK-0011(M) random-access memory (RAM). In minimal configuration, the system could occupy less than 4 Kb of RAM.

The system was able to support up to 64 disk drives (or hard disk drive partitions), and RAM disks in the computer's memory and tape recording. It could also have read-only access to MicroDOS file system format disks, although in the last version, this function was transferred from system core to the file manager and became optional.
