= Kildall =

Kildall is a surname. Notable people with the surname include:

- Gary Arlen Kildall (1942–1994), American computer scientist and microcomputer entrepreneur
- Dorothy Kildall née McEwen (1943–2005), American microcomputer developer
- Scott Kildall (born 1969), American conceptual artist and performer
