= Peripheral Interchange Program =

File transfer utility

Peripheral Interchange Program (PIP)
- Original author: Digital Equipment Corporation / Harrison "Dit" Morse
- Developers: Digital Research / Gary Kildall, Heath Company
- Initial release: 1960s; 65 years ago
- Operating system: BATCH-11/DOS-11, RT-11, RSTS/E, RSX-11, OS/8, TOPS-10, TOPS-20, CP/M, MP/M, DOS Plus, HDOS, VMS
- Type: Command

Peripheral Interchange Program (PIP) was a utility to transfer files on and between devices on Digital Equipment Corporation's computers. It was first implemented on the PDP-6 architecture by Harrison "Dit" Morse early in the 1960s. It was subsequently implemented for DEC's operating systems for PDP-10, PDP-11, and PDP-8 architectures. In the 1970s and 1980s Digital Research implemented PIP on CP/M and MP/M.

== History ==
It is said that during development it was named ATLATL, which is an acronym for "Anything, Lord, to Anything, Lord." This humorously described both its purpose as a device-independent file copying tool and the difficulties at the time of safely copying files between devices.

The original PIP syntax was

PIP destination←source /switches

using the left-arrow character from the ASCII-1963 character set that the Flexowriter keyboards of the time used. As other terminals were introduced that used later versions of ASCII (without the left-arrow character), PIP allowed the syntax

PIP destination=source

The underscore (_) character, which was in the same ASCII character position that left-arrow had occupied, was still supported to separate the destination and source specifications.

Source and destination were file specification strings. These consisted of a device name, typically 2 characters for device type such as DK (disk), LP (line printer), MT (magnetic tape), etc. and a unit number from 0 to 7, a colon (:), filename and extension.

Copying was generally permitted between any file specification to any other where it made sense.

Early versions of VAX/VMS implemented certain DCL commands, such as DIRECTORY and RENAME, by running RSX-11M PIP in compatibility mode. This usage of PIP was replaced by VAX-specific code in VAX/VMS 2.0, but PIP remained as part of the VAX-11 RSX layered product for VMS.

As late as the mid-1980s, PIP was still in common use on TOPS-10, TOPS-20 and PDP-11 systems.

== PIP in CP/M and MP/M ==
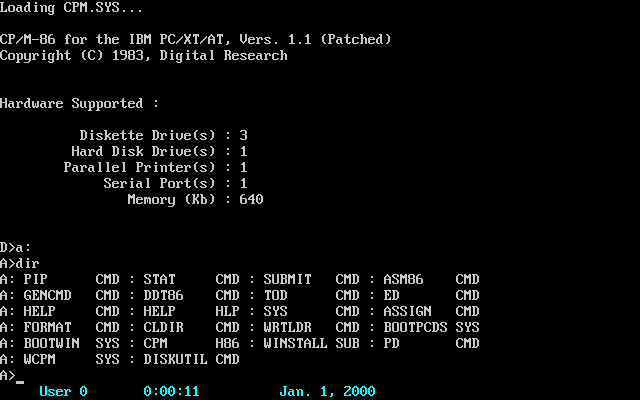
PIP.CMD in CP/M-86

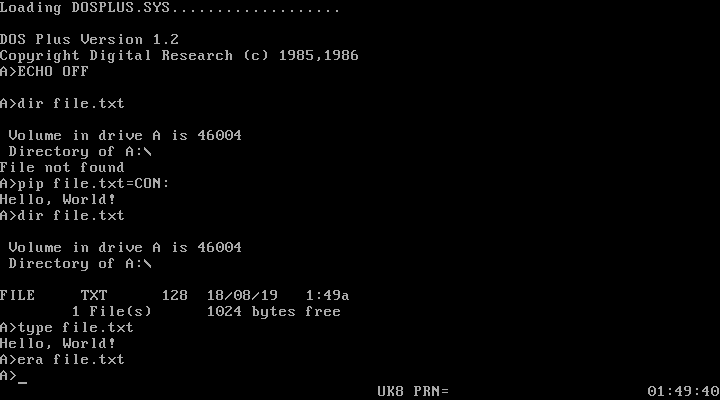
Example using the PIP command in DOS Plus to create a text file from CON: console input

Gary Kildall, who developed CP/M and MP/M, based much of the design of its file structure and command processor on operating systems from Digital Equipment, such as RSTS/E for the PDP-11. Besides accessing files on a floppy disk, the PIP command in CP/M could also transfer data to and from the following "special files":

- CON: — console (input and output)
- AUX: — an auxiliary device. In CP/M 1 and 2, PIP used PUN: (paper tape punch) and RDR: (paper tape reader) instead of AUX:
- LST: — list output device, usually the printer
- PRN: — as LST:, but lines were numbered, tabs expanded and form feeds added every 60 lines
- NUL: — null device, akin to \Device\Null and /dev/null
- EOF: — input device that produced end-of-file characters, ASCII 0x1A
- INP: — custom input device, by default the same as EOF:
- PUN: — punch card unit
- OUT: — custom output device, by default the same as NUL:

These were not true device files, however, because their handling was limited to PIP. The two custom devices INP: and OUT: were implemented as calls to fixed locations at the start of the PIP program; the intention was that the user, or the OEM, could patch these locations to add their own input or output devices. 246 bytes of free space were left in the program for this purpose.

In addition to the usual PIP destination=source syntax, PIP under CP/M still allowed the old PIP destination_source form. This behaviour was not documented, and CP/M generally did not have a standard for which characters could appear in file names; therefore other programs could and did create filenames containing underscore characters, which PIP could not handle.

== Reserved filenames in Microsoft Windows ==
The PIP program is the reason for reserved filenames in Microsoft Windows: CON PRN AUX NUL COM0 COM1 COM2 COM3 COM4 COM5 COM6 COM7 COM8 COM9 LPT0 LPT1 LPT2 LPT3 LPT4 LPT5 LPT6 LPT7 LPT8 LPT9. This limitation is case-insensitive, and also applies to basenames. So for example, Con.txt is an invalid filename.

== See also ==
- copy (command) – RT-11, RSX-11, OpenVMS, AmigaOS, DOS, OS/2 and Microsoft Windows command for copying data
- cp (Unix) – Unix command for copying data
- Kermit (protocol)
