= Fujitsu Micro 16s =

Personal computer launched in 1983

- Manufacturer: Fujitsu
- Released: 1983; 43 years ago
- Discontinued: 1986
- Operating system: Concurrent CP/M-86, MP/M-86, MS-DOS, CP/M, Unix
- CPU: Intel 8086, Zilog Z80A @ 8 MHz, 4 MHz
- Memory: 128 KB up to 1152 KB
- Display: 640x200 resolution with 8 colors per pixel, RGB color video monitor.
- Graphics: Motorola 6845
- Sound: Tone generator

The Fujitsu Micro 16s was a business personal computer from Fujitsu that was launched in 1983, around the same time as the launch of the original IBM PC/XT. The Micro 16s used a plug in microprocessor board, and two models were offered, an Intel 8086 and a Zilog Z80 expansion board. Additional expansion boards with the Motorola 68000, Intel 80286 and Zilog Z8000 processors were also planned. Additionally it had a Motorola 6809 co-processor.

As operating systems one could choose between Concurrent CP/M-86 with GSX graphic extension, MP/M-86, MS-DOS, CP/M (for the Z80 board) and Unix.

It could support up to four 320 KB 5.25-inch floppy disk drives, and a hard disk of up to 20 MB.

It had advanced color graphics with 640x200 resolution with 8 colors per pixel, based on a Motorola 6845 video chip, and used an RGB color video monitor.

Up to 1152 KB of memory could be supported.

The Fujitsu Micro 16s series was discontinued in 1986.

== See also ==
- Kanji CP/M-86 (1984)
