= Philips :YES =

Home computer/personal computer released by Philips Austria

- Type: Personal computer
- Released: 1985
- Operating system: DOS Plus, MS-DOS, Concurrent DOS
- CPU: Intel 80186 @ 8 MHz
- Memory: 128 KiB to 640 KiB
- Removable storage: Two 3½-inch 720 KB floppy disc drives. Optional: external 3½-inch or 5¼-inch floppy disc drives
- Display: Text; 160×252 16 colours; 320×252 16 colours; 640×252 4 colours; 640×252 2 colours + intensity;
- Graphics: HD46505SP

The Philips :YES was a home computer/personal computer released by Philips Austria, in 1985. It was not fully IBM PC compatible, a reason given for its commercial failure. The system was only sold in limited quantities.

== Technical specifications ==
- Microprocessor: Intel 80186 @ 8 MHz
- ROM: 192 KiB
- RAM: 128 to 640 KiB
- Keyboard: mechanical, with 93 keys
- Operating system: DOS Plus (in 64 KiB ROM), MS-DOS, Concurrent DOS
- Storage: two 3½-inch drives, 720 KiB each. One or two optional external 3½-inch or 5¼-inch drives.
- Video modes:
  - A0: Text, 40 columns × 25 rows, 8 colours
  - A1: Text, 80 columns × 25 rows, 8 colours
  - A2: Text, 80 columns × 25 rows, 2 colours + intensity
  - G0: 160 × 252 pixels, 16 colours
  - G1: 640 × 252 pixels, 2 colours + intensity
  - G2: 320 × 252 pixels, 16 colours
  - G3: 640 × 252 pixels, 4 colours

The built-in graphics hardware (based on the Hitachi HD46505SP video controller) supported composite video output. An additional video module allowed output to TTL monochrome monitors, colour monitors or SCART televisions.

Video RAM was shared with system RAM. Before using graphics modes, memory had to be allocated for them with the GRAPHICS or GRCHAR commands.

An expansion card (the Professional Expansion Board) provided:

- Extra RAM.
- A SASI/SCSI hard-drive interface.
- A mouse interface.
- A battery-backed real-time clock.

An additional expansion card was available in limited quantity (probably only sold in the Netherlands directly to Philips employees) to make it 100% IBM PC compatible. This card was made of two separate cards, one for the actual compatibility, which ended in an 8 bit ISA slot, where an Hercules Graphics Card monochrome video card was plugged in. This also meant that using this card, would require to plug the monitor into the new video card, bypassing the onboard graphical card. This expansion card made it possible to run all DOS programs (including popular games at that time).

== Operating system versions ==
Known operating systems adapted for the Philips :YES include:

- DOS Plus 1.? in ROM (with BDOS 4.1). The BDOS in ROM does not implement the S_OSVER call, which would have returned the version number to display.
- DOS Plus 1.1 on disk (with BDOS 4.1)
- DOS Plus 1.2 on disk (with BDOS 4.1)
- DOS Plus 2.1 on disk (with BDOS 5.0)
- Concurrent DOS
- MS-DOS 2.??
- MS-DOS 3.10

== Popular software ==
- WordPerfect 4.2
- Microsoft Windows 1.02

== See also ==
- Rodime (manufacturer of internal hard disk)
- MSX-DOS
