= Johnson-Laird =

Johnson-Laird may refer to:

- Johnson-Laird Inc.
- Andy Johnson-Laird
- Philip Johnson-Laird
