= Gordon Eubanks =

American computer software pioneer

- Born: Gordon Edwin Eubanks Jr. November 7, 1946 (age 79)
- Education: Oklahoma State University
- Occupation: Computer programmer
- Known for: BASIC-E, CBASIC
- Spouse: Ronda Eubanks
- Children: Keith Eubanks

Gordon Edwin Eubanks Jr. (born November 7, 1946) is an American microcomputer industry pioneer who worked with Gary Kildall in the early days of Digital Research (DRI).

Eubanks attended Oklahoma State University, where he was involved as a member of Pi Kappa Alpha fraternity. Kildall was his graduate thesis advisor at the Naval Postgraduate School in Monterey, California. Eubank's 1976 master's thesis was a BASIC language compiler called BASIC-E designed for Kildall's new CP/M operating system. Over the next year and a half, Eubanks wrote the popular CBASIC compiler for IMSAI while he was still a naval officer. Friends of Eubanks say he called it "CBASIC" because he wrote it while serving on a submarine (at sea). Other people say the name CBASIC referred to "commercial" basic, because it incorporated BCD mathematics which eliminated MBASIC's rounding errors that were sometimes troublesome for accounting.

In 1981, after Microsoft moved from programming languages into operating systems, Digital Research improved its position in programming languages by acquiring Eubanks's company, Compiler Systems. Eubanks went to work at DRI, but he soon came to doubt the company's long-term prospects. In 1984, Eubanks joined Symantec and from 1984 to 1986 he helped develop Q & A, an integrated database and wordprocessor with natural language query. He went on to become president and CEO of Symantec, guiding it into the software utility and anti-virus business.

He left in 1999 to become president and CEO of Oblix, a Silicon Valley company producing software for web security. Oblix was acquired by Oracle in March 2005. Eubanks is a director of Concur and joined the board of directors of Oakley Networks in February 2006.

Eubanks is a stamp collector. A specialist of the first stamps issued nationally in the United States between 1847 and 1861. For two collections he exhibited, he won the American Philatelic Society's title of "champion of champions" in 2012 and 2014.

Eubanks is married to Ronda Eubanks, and has a son, Keith, as of January 1995.
