= CMD file =

CMD file may refer to:

- CMD file (CP/M), executables in CP/M-86, Concurrent CP/M-86, Personal CP/M-86, Concurrent DOS, DOS Plus, FlexOS, S5-DOS, Multiuser DOS, System Manager, REAL/32, SCP1700, CP/K and K8918-OS
- Batch files with .cmd filename extension in OS/2, Windows NT, 4OS2, 4NT and Take Command
- REXX scripts in OS/2 using the native or an alternative REXX interpreter
