= Pascal/MT+ =

Pascal compiler written in 1980 by Michael Lehman

Pascal/MT+ was an ISO 7185 compatible Pascal compiler written in 1980 by Michael Lehman, founder of MT MicroSYSTEMS of Solana Beach, California. The company was acquired by Digital Research in 1981 which subsequently distributed versions that ran on the 8080/Z80 processor under the CP/M operating system. Later versions ran on the 68000 CPU under CP/M-68K, and the 8086 CPU under CP/M-86 and MS-DOS.

Pascal/MT+, for the 8086, was available for CP/M-86, PC DOS/MS-DOS as well as RMX-86 (a proprietary OS from Intel). Pascal/MT+86 still runs today on even the latest version of Microsoft Windows and DR-DOS.
