= Andy Johnson-Laird =

English-American computer scientist

Andy Johnson-Laird (born February 1945) is an English-American computer scientist. He was the president of digital forensics firm Johnson-Laird Inc. in Portland, Oregon, where he lived with his wife, Kay Kitagawa.

== Early life ==
Johnson-Laird was born in Sheffield in England in February 1945. He was educated at Culford School and then attended the Regent Street Polytechnic, now known as The University of Westminster. Johnson-Laird also has lived in Ferney-Voltaire (France), Toronto (Canada), and San Jose, (Northern California).

Johnson-Laird's computer career started in 1963 at National Cash Register Company's London offices where he worked as a computer operator and taught himself to program the NCR 315 mainframe computer during the night shift. He was then invited to teach as a lecturer in NCR's Computer Education department, teaching NCR customers how to program. Subsequently, he wrote system software for the NCR-Elliott 4100 mainframe computer. Johnson-Laird also worked as a systems programmer for Control Data Corporation in Ferney-Voltaire in support of supercomputer installations at CERN. and various universities in Europe. He transferred to Control Data Corporation's Toronto Development Facility in 1977.

In the late 1970s, Johnson-Laird applied his knowledge of mainframe computers to the emerging hobbyist personal computer market. He purchased and hand-built a SOL-20 personal computer from Processor Technology, and a Cromemco Z-2 as test platforms.

== Immigration ==
Johnson-Laird's 1979 immigration to the United States resulted in litigation over "a legal issue of first impression" concerning "the proper interpretation of section 101(a)(15)(L) of the Immigration and Nationality Act, 8 U.S.C. s 1101(a)(15)(L), which allows 'a firm or corporation or other legal entity' to petition for the granting of 'non-immigrant' status to employees which it wishes to transfer to corporate posts in this country". Johnson-Laird was successful in his challenge to the agency's interpretation of this rule to not permit a petition for an "L" visa by a sole proprietorship. Johnson-Laird was represented by Portland immigration attorney, Gerald H. Robinson Esq. United States District Court Judge James Redden ruled that "Congress intended that the legal status of the petitioning business not be a dispositive consideration in immigration proceedings".

On arriving in the US in 1979, Johnson-Laird wrote the software drivers to permit the CP/M Operating System to run on an Onyx computer—this was the first commercial CP/M microcomputer with a hard disk and a data cartridge tape drive.

Johnson-Laird is one of the early pioneers in the field of digital forensics. His specialty, developed in 1987, is forensic software analysis of computer and Internet-based evidence for copyright, patent, and trade-secret litigation. He is also an expert on software reverse engineering, software development, and developing software in a clean-room environment.

Johnson-Laird developed techniques for computerized source code analysis and the presentation of computer-based evidence that have helped to bring digital forensics into the courtroom. He has served as a Special Master to Federal District Court judges, and has served as an expert witness and provided litigation testimony in many intellectual property cases in the United States and Singapore. He also has published numerous articles on topics related to digital forensics and the legal challenges posed by emerging technologies.

== Computer software expert witness ==
In addition to serving as a technical expert in high-profile and significant litigation, Johnson-Laird's published writings have been cited by the United States Court of Appeals for the Ninth Circuit, first in Sega Enterprises Ltd., v. Accolade Inc., No. 92-15665, D. C. No. CV-91-3871-BAC, as authority for practical necessity to make intermediary copies to understand protected expression in software. Later the court cited Johnson-Laird's article "Software Reverse Engineering in the Real World," University of Dayton Law Review, Volume 19, November 3, Spring 1994, in the case Sony v. Connectix, No. 99-15852, D.C. No. CV-99-00390-CAL, as authority for the need to reverse engineer when developing compatible products and therefore the intermediary copies created in such reverse engineering should be considered fair use under U.S. Copyright Law.

In 1994, the Honorable Marvin J. Garbis, in the U.S. District Court for the District of Maryland appointed Johnson-Laird as a court-appointed expert in the matter of Vaughn v. Amprey, Civil Action No. MJG-84-1911. Additionally, in 2007 Johnson-Laird was appointed as Special Master by Judge Stephen V. Wilson, Central District of California, in the MGM Studios, Inc. v. Grokster, Ltd. case. His appointment on remand encompassed recommending appropriate actions to impose by Permanent Injunction on Defendant StreamCast that would "cope with the copyright infringement" caused by peer-to-peer file sharing systems, while "preserving non-infringing uses" of the system. In 2010, he was appointed Special Master in DataSci v. Medidata, a case before the Honorable Marvin J. Garbis, in the U.S. District Court for the District of Maryland. His role was to resolve discovery disputes relating to the production of computer source code.

=== Role in the CP/M v. DOS dispute ===
Because of Johnson-Laird's experience with writing the software drivers for the Basic Input/Output System (BIOS) for various microcomputers, John Katsaros of Digital Research engaged him to create BIOS drivers for CP/M-86 for the first IBM personal computer. Working in conditions of considerable IBM-imposed secrecy in Digital Research's Pacific Grove offices, Johnson-Laird discovered a Microsoft employee's name, Bob O'Rear, in the boot sector of the PC DOS diskette. He reported this and the numerous similarities in the application programming interface of PC DOS and CP/M to Gary Kildall. Kildall was stunned to see the similarities. "There were some shallow changes, but it was essentially the same program," Johnson-Laird reported in an interview with BusinessWeek. It later turned out that Microsoft had licensed a program called 86-DOS from Seattle Computer Products. Tim Paterson had created 86-DOS, which he originally called QDOS, by copying the functional application programming interface from the CP/M manuals. 86-DOS became Microsoft's MS-DOS and IBM's PC DOS.

== Photography and documentaries ==
Johnson-Laird is a photographer and a documentary film maker. In 2005 he implemented a variant of a technique known as streak photography, that used computer software to create computer-generated images. His techniques of computational photography create photographs that are compositions of color and line that appear realistic, but are not. In 2010, in collaboration with Kay Kitagawa and Dina Gomez, Johnson-Laird directed, produced, and edited "EMMA: Unplugged," a 90-minute documentary of the 2010 Emma International Collaboration, an artists' retreat in the Saskatchewan boreal forest hosted by the Saskatchewan Craft Council. He has also directed, produced, and edited other video projects.

== Works authored ==
Published writings by Johnson-Laird include:

- "Software-Related Litigation: Discovery and The Overly-Protective Order" (co-authored with Lydia Pallas Loren), 6 FEDERAL COURTS L. REV. 1 (2012)
- "Looking Forward, Legislating Backward?", 4 J. Small & Emerging Bus. L. 95, 101 (2000)
- "The Discovery Of Computer Software In Patent Litigation", Federal Courts Law Review (an on-line law journal), March 1998
- "A House Divided: Internet Technology From The Ground Up", A. Johnson-Laird and Niels Johnson-Laird, Journal of Internet Law, Volume 1, Number 1, July 1997.
- "The Anatomy Of The Internet Meets The Body Of The Law", University of Dayton Law Review, Volume 22, Number 3, Spring 1997.
- "Detecting and Demonstrating Plagiarism in Digital Images", co-written with Ewan Croft, The Multimedia Strategist, Volume 1, Number 9, July 1995.
- "Smoking Guns and Spinning Disks: The preservation, production, and forensic analysis of computer-based evidence", The Computer Lawyer, Volume 11, Number 8, August 1994.
- "Reverse Engineering of Software: Separating Legal Mythology from Actual Technology". The Software Law Journal, Volume V, Number 2, April 1992.
- "Using a Computer Expert to Analyze Computer-Based Evidence", The Computer Law Association Bulletin, Volume 7, Number 1, 1992.
- "Ingeniería Regresiva en Software: Separando la Mitología Legal de la Tecnología Real", Derecho De La Alta Tecnologia, Volume III, Number 34/35, June/July 1991.
- "Reverse Engineering of Software: Separating Legal Mythology from Modern Day Technology", TekBriefs, Number 5, January/February 1991.
- "Software Development and 'Reverse Engineering'" Eleventh Annual Computer Law Institute, Cosponsored by the Computer Law Association and University of Southern California Law Center, May 1990.
- "Neural Networks: The next intellectual property nightmare?" The Computer Lawyer, Volume 7, Number 3, March 1990.
- "The Programmer's CP/M Handbook" Osborne/McGraw Hill, 1983 (ISBN 0-88134-119-3). CP/M was the first de facto standard operating systems for microcomputers and was the base from which Microsoft's MS-DOS and IBM's PC DOS came.

Johnson-Laird also serves on the Editorial Board for the Federal Courts Law Review, an on-line journal for Federal Judges.
