= Jessica Meuninck-Ganger =

American artist

Jessica Meuninck–Ganger is an American printmaker, educator, and book artist. She is based in Milwaukee.

== Early life and education ==
Meuninck–Ganger began her professional career teaching in the Elkhart Memorial High School art department, where she received the Sallie Mae Outstanding Beginning Teacher award. While teaching in Indiana, she co-chaired the Scholastic Art and Writing Awards for the Indiana/Michigan region, and taught summer courses through the Elkhart School Corporation's Gifted and Talented Program.

She received her MFA in studio art from the Minneapolis College of Art and Design in Minneapolis, Minnesota, in 2004, and a BS degree in visual arts education from Ball State University in Muncie, Indiana, in 1995. She is currently an assistant professor of art at the University of Wisconsin–Milwaukee.

== Work ==
Meuninck-Ganger is mostly known for her collaborations with new media artist Nathaniel Stern; their work combines various forms of traditional printmaking with video and machinima. As a duo, the artists "mount translucent prints and drawings on top of video monitors, which appear to bring moving images to life on paper." According to Chris Roper of South Africa's Mail and Guardian, "The work is funny, pretty and accessible, but it’s also complicated, surprising, exceedingly well crafted and rewards a long-term relationship." The works pay homage to and cite artists including Diego Velázquez, Katsushika Hokusai, Eadweard Muybridge, Claude Monet, Jan van Eyck, William Kentridge, and Utagawa Hiroshige.

In 2019, Meuninck-Ganger was an artist in residence at Banyan Hearts studio with Marjan Cornelius.

== Recognition ==
Meuninck-Ganger's work has been exhibited regionally, nationally and internationally. Her prints and books are included in several private collections, as well as in portfolios owned by the Weisman Art Museum and the Target Corporation. She has received numerous residencies and fellowships, and has instructed various printmaking courses and workshops at the South Bend Museum of Art, Charles Martin Youth Center, High Point, North Carolina Center for Printmaking, Minnesota Center for Book Arts, Minneapolis College of Art and Design, and Milwaukee Institute of Art and Design.
