= Nathaniel Stern =

American artist (born 1977)

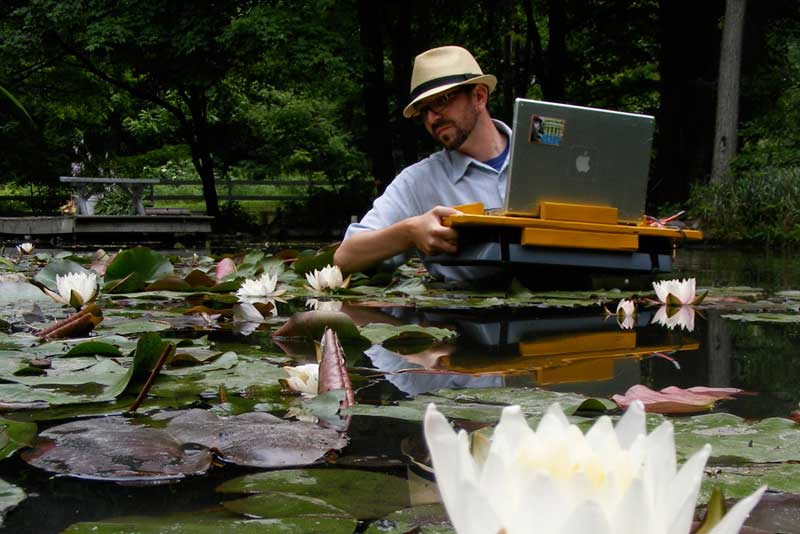
- Nathaniel Stern scanning lilies in Indiana
- Born: 1977 (age 48–49); New York
- Education: Cornell University, New York University, Trinity College, Dublin
- Known for: New media
- Awards: Transmediale Award finalist, two Brett Kebble Art Awards, Leonardo Abstracts Top Ranking (MIT Press)
- Website: http://nathanielstern.com/

Nathaniel Stern (born 1977) is an American/South African interdisciplinary artist who works in a variety of media, including photography, interactive art, public art interventions, installation, video art, net.art and printmaking. He is currently a professor of Art and Mechanical Engineering at the University of Wisconsin–Milwaukee.

== Career ==
Stern graduated with a degree in Textiles and Apparel Design from Cornell University in Ithaca, New York in 1999, and went on to study at the Interactive Telecommunications Program at New York University, graduating in 2001. He later taught digital art at the University of the Witwatersrand, while also practicing as an artist, in Johannesburg, South Africa from 2001 to 2006. He holds a PhD from Trinity College in Dublin, Ireland, where he wrote a dissertation on interactive art and embodiment.

Stern's early study of fashion design, slam poetry and music led to his interest in the relationships between the body and text, and eventually to that of broadly interpreted notions of performance and performativity, especially in relation to the body and embodiment. He states that his interactive work treats "the body and art as cooperative sites of potential resistance," seeing them as mutable entities that "per-form" themselves in relation to their environments, rather than being extant and "pre-formed." Stern's other work often attempts to bring his ideas around performance, embodiment, time and interactivity to more traditional forms like sculpture, drawing and print by combining them with digital and networked media.

== Work ==
Stern's interactive art is centered around bodily provocations, often asking his viewers to "perform" — whether publicly or privately. His pieces attempt to "get people to move in ways they normally wouldn't," and accent said movements in relation to their surroundings. His installation enter:hektor asks participants to chase projected words with their arms and bodies in order to trigger spoken word in the space, and his subsequent piece, stuttering, floods the interaction area with too many trigger points, pushing its viewers "not to interact."

His early (2005) and ongoing Compressionist prints, conversely, ask Stern himself to move in ways he normally wouldn't. These images are made through performances with scanners, Stern often tying or rigging a flat-bed to his own body, then traversing the landscape — avowedly referencing Impressionism and Abstract Expressionism. These are colored in Photoshop, then printed on metallic paper and/or transformed into hand-made prints, using more traditional techniques.

Stern's video art tends to be in a performative writing style, where he often plays out characters he has created, or uses found footage from films, to explore the fragility of language. He has also worked on collaborative multimedia performances that explore similar issues, usually with more explicit political messages, such as challenging the discourse surrounding HIV/AIDS in South Africa.

Stern's interventionist projects are always site-specific, playful and political. In his Wireframe Series, he has volunteers from the streets of Dubrovnik, Croatia or Johannesburg, South Africa, physically erect temporary, 3D architectural structures made of rope. Each of these custom "public spaces" are "activated" only through their "contact with people," and take on different meanings in each context. In Doin' my Part to Lighten the Load, Stern challenges power relations between artists and critics, and black and white — as well as electrical "power structures" — by convincing South African arts writer, and editor of Art South Africa magazine, Sean O'Toole, to give up electricity for 24 hours; Stern hired workers off the street to follow O'Toole around his apartment with hand-crank generators and bulbs for the evening.

Stern's Distill Life works, multimedia collaborations with Milwaukee artist Jessica Meuninck-Ganger that began in 2009, combine various forms of traditional printmaking with video and machinima. Here the artists "mount translucent prints and drawings on top of video monitors, which appear to bring moving images to life on paper." According to Chris Roper of South Africa's Mail and Guardian, "The work is funny, pretty and accessible, but it’s also complicated, surprising, exceedingly well crafted and rewards a long-term relationship." The works pay homage to and cite a number of artists, including Diego Velázquez, Katsushika Hokusai, Eadweard Muybridge, Claude Monet, Jan van Eyck, William Kentridge, Utagawa Hiroshige and others.

Stern's Second Life-based mixed reality art work explores "the juxtaposition of old and new media and illuminates the possibilities and limitations of both." Given Time enacts a permanent "connection between two simulated people staring wordlessly at each other across real space." According to John Mitchell, Stern uses "Second Life as a medium much like oil paint or marble, hand-drawing two Second Life avatars and pulling them from out of their universe and into ours. In the gallery, they exist on two large screens facing each other, and the viewer may only encounter them by walking between the screens." The piece directly references both the book Given Time by Jacques Derrida, and the artwork Untitled (Perfect Lovers) by Félix González-Torres.

=== Stern and Creative Commons ===
Stern is an advocate of Creative Commons (CC), with his blog, and many of his pieces, under CC or GPL. He has been a contributing member of iCommons since its inception, and was an artist in residence with them in 2006 and 2007, the second year of which he ran the program. He believes that "as many people as possible need to see art and talk about it" because it "always brings... value" to "the cultural sphere"; he uses CC as a "tactic for the most effective art work, and with the recognition that this will only bring more value — both culturally and monetarily — to [his] work more generally, whether it's for sale or not."

=== Wikipedia Art ===
On February 14, 2009, Stern and Scott Kildall created a Wikipedia article called "Wikipedia Art", which sought to "invite performative utterances in order to change" what content was acceptable to include in the article itself. That was simultaneously a self-referential performance art piece called Wikipedia Art. Although the creators encouraged editors to strictly follow Wikipedia guidelines in editing the page, Wikipedia editors determined its intent was nonetheless in violation of site rules, and it was deleted within 15 hours of its initial posting. The resulting controversy received national coverage, including an article in The Wall Street Journal. The Wikimedia Foundation later claimed Stern and Kildall had infringed on the Wikipedia trademark with their own website, wikipediaart.org. The artists publicly released a letter they received in March 2009 from a law firm requesting that they turn over their domain name to Wikipedia. Mike Godwin, then the foundation's legal counsel, later stated that they would not pursue any further legal action. Mary Louise Schumacher of The Milwaukee Journal Sentinel compared the incident to the "outrage inspired by Marcel Duchamp's urinal or Andy Warhol's Brillo Boxes." Yale research fellow Claire Gordon called the article an example of the "feedback loop" of "Wikipedia’s totalizing claims to knowledge" in a 2011 Huffington Post report.

Wikipedia Art was included in the Internet Pavilion of the Venice Biennale for 2009. In 2011, it appeared in a revised form at the Transmediale festival in Berlin, where it was an award finalist.

=== Tweets in Space ===
In 2012, Stern and Kildall again partnered on a project called Tweets In Space, inviting participants to submit tweets to be transmitted to the planet GJ 667Cc, whose conditions scientists believe may be capable of supporting life. The transmission is scheduled to take place in September 2012 at the International Symposium on Electronic Art in Albuquerque, New Mexico. Stern and Kildall used RocketHub to fundraise the money needed to access a transmitter capable of reaching the planet. In addition, code developed for the project is planned for release to open source. According to Stern and Kildall, the goal of Tweets In Space is to activate "a potent conversation about communication and life that traverses beyond our borders or understanding."

== Exhibitions ==
In 2003 and 2004, Stern exhibited at the now defunct Brett Kebble Art Awards, South Africa's largest contemporary art competition at the time. Both years, he won prizes for interactive installations, and is credited with being "at least partly responsible for opening space within that national art event for interactive or New Media work generally." From December 2004 to January 2005, Stern held his first major solo exhibition, The Storytellers, at the Johannesburg Art Gallery, South Africa's largest, internationally recognized publicly funded museum.

In 2006 and 2007, Stern held two solo exhibitions of his Compressionist prints in South Africa. The series premiered in Time and Seeing at Pretoria's experimental Outlet Gallery, and a much larger body of work, including digital and traditional prints, opened as Call and Response at Johannesburg's Art on Paper Gallery (now called Gallery AOP). On January 31, 2008, Ten Cubed Gallery in Second Life was launched. For its inaugural exhibition, Crossing the Void II, owner and curator Haydn Shaughnessy selected five artists working in and with modern technologies: Stern along with Chris Ashley from Oakland, CA; Jon Coffelt from New York, NY; Claire Keating from Cork, Ireland; and Scott Kildall from San Francisco, CA.

In 2010, Stern's Distill Life collaborations with Jessica Meuninck-Ganger were presented as part of the Passing Between solo exhibition at Gallery AOP in Johannesburg, as well as solo exhibitions at the Museum of Wisconsin Art and Elaine Erickson Gallery in Wisconsin. Given Time launched as part of a solo exhibition at Greylocks Arts in March 2010. The show, which also exhibited Distill Life works, was curated by Jo-Anne Green of Turbulence.org. Falling Still, a collaboration with Yevgeniya Kaganovich," premiered in the Art History Gallery at the University of Wisconsin in December 2010.

In June 2011 Stern again worked with Kaganovich on Strange Vegetation, a project involving "breathing" latex sculptures that react to changes in light and temperature. The installation was displayed at the Villa Terrace Decorative Arts Museum in Milwaukee, Wisconsin. In August of the same year, Stern's exhibit Giverny of the Midwest opened at Gallery AOP in Johannesburg. The exhibit, inspired by Claude Monet's series Water Lilies, featured images of a pond in Indiana taken with a HP scanner while Stern walked through the pond. In October 2011, Stern and Jessica Meuninck-Ganger's collaborative project 13 Views of a Journey opened at the Haggerty Museum of Art on the Marquette University campus featuring a blend of print and video imagery.

Stern's work has also been shown at the Venice Biennale, Museum of Contemporary Art, Sydney, South African National Gallery, Johannesburg Art Gallery, International Print Center New York, Herbert F. Johnson Museum of Art, Pretoria Art Museum, John Michael Kohler Arts Center, Milwaukee Art Museum, Museum of Wisconsin Art, Inter-Society for the Electronic Arts and festivals and performances all over the world.
