= Kathryn Strutynski =

American computer scientist

- Born: Kathryn Betty Latimer; 5 February 1931; Nephi, Utah, US
- Died: 9 April 2010 (aged 79); Calgary, Canada
- Resting place: Nephi, Utah, US
- Education: Brigham Young University, Naval Postgraduate School
- Spouse: Alfred Waldemar Strutynski
- Children: Karen Strutynski née Strutynski

Kathryn Betty Strutynski (née Latimer) (5 February 1931 – 9 April 2010) was a mathematician and computer scientist, and attended university at Brigham Young University and the Naval Postgraduate School. Besides jobs at Pan Am Airways and Bechtel Corporation, she worked at Digital Research, where she contributed to the development of CP/M, the first mainstream operating system for microcomputers.

== Early life and education ==
Kathryn Betty Latimer was born on 5 February 1931 in Nephi, Utah, USA. Her father was Andrew Hans Latimer and her mother Henrietta Norton.

Latimer obtained an undergraduate degree in mathematics from Brigham Young University in 1953, and taught high school mathematics in Utah for two years.

== Career ==
In the early 1950s, she moved to San Francisco, where she worked at Pan Am Airways doing research. Kathy eventually became responsible for all the charter bids at the Western Division of Pan Am. When Pan Am consolidated its offices in New York Latimer was the only woman to be offered moving expenses to relocate to New York, but she declined the offer.

After Pan Am, Kathryn Latimer worked at McGraw-Hill and the estimating department of Bechtel Corporation. When the company decided to purchase a mainframe computer, Latimer was sent to take every class given at IBM. In 1952 and 1953, she built the company's first database retrieval system, with 10 engineers working under her charge, renting computer time since they did not have a mainframe computer at that time. The database was used for a period of ten years. In 1958, she married Alfred Waldemar Strutynski.

Kathryn Strutynski's husband moved to Monterey, California to work for the County of Monterey as an auditor. The couple lived in Carmel Village, where she worked at the Naval Postgraduate School (NPS) since 1967 and completed a master's degree program in computer programming at the same time. Strutynski was given system responsibility for the VM operating system at the NPS. At the same time, Gary Kildall also taught at the NPS and was interested in operating systems. They became friends, studied and made unofficial changes to CP/CMS and VM/370.

=== Digital Research ===
Kathryn Strutynski left NPS and, in 1978/1979, became the fourth employee of Digital Research, Inc. She adapted CP/M-80 for the Apple II and worked on CP/M 2.0, CP/M 2.2, CP/M Plus, and DESPOOL, a background spooler for printing (utilizing simple multi-tasking) as well as on the system guides. She also was the project manager for CP/M-86, Concurrent CP/M-86 and Concurrent PC DOS.

Around 1985, Strutynski returned to work for NPS at the W. R. Church Computer Center, where she raised the PC lab and taught MS-DOS and WordPerfect courses as Manager of Microcomputing Support and Learning Resource Centers.

In her later years, she ran Strutynski Associates in Carmel.

== Personal life ==
Kathryn Latimer met Alfred Waldemar Strutynski in a German dance hall. They married in 1958 and moved to Carmel since her husband had started working for Monterey County as an auditor. She worked for the Naval Postgraduate School in Monterey and later at Digital Research.

== Death ==
Kathryn Strutynski died on 9 April 2010 at her daughter's home in Calgary while she was 79. Her husband died two days later.

== In popular culture ==
Harold Evans wrote about her in his book They Made America (2004). For the reworked paperback issue (2006), Strutynski spent many hours working with Evans updating the chapter of his book related to the birth of CP/M.

== See also ==
- Intel INTERP
- Apple CP/M (Digital Research CP/M-80 with 6 MHz Advanced Logic Systems (ALS) "The CP/M Card" for the Apple II)
- History of personal computers
