= Dorothy McEwen Kildall =

American microcomputer industry pioneer

- Born: Dorothy Gene McEwen; March 3, 1943; Seattle, Washington, US
- Died: January 31, 2005 (aged 61); Carmel Valley, California, US
- Occupation: microcomputer industry pioneer

Dorothy Gene McEwen Kildall, often known as Dorothy McEwen, (March 3, 1943–January 31, 2005) was an American microcomputer industry pioneer. In 1974, she co-founded Digital Research, the company that developed the first computer language, the first compiler and the first mainstream operating system for microcomputers.

== Early years and education ==
Dorothy McEwen was born on 3 March 1943 in Seattle, Washington, USA. She was the daughter of Marion Strout and Gene McEwen.

After high school, she attended the University of Washington. After a few years, she abandoned studies and for the next several years, she worked to support her husband as he went to the same university.

== Professional career ==
McEwen Kildall cofounded Digital Research, managing the company's marketing and daily operations. In 1980, she was involved in IBM's unsuccessful attempt to license CP/M for the IBM Personal Computer.

== Personal life ==
McEwen married her high school mate Gary Kildall. In 1969, the couple moved to the Monterey Peninsula and she gave birth to her son Scott Kildall in 1969 and her daughter Kristin Kildall.

McEwen died in Carmel Valley on January 31, 2005, from brain cancer.

== See also ==
- Gary Kildall
- Scott Kildall
- Digital Research
- CP/M
- Carmel Valley Village, California
