= Scott Kildall =

American conceptual artist (born 1969)

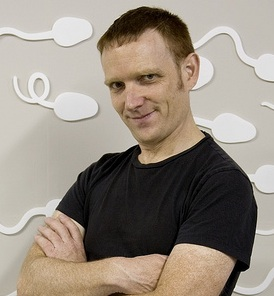
- Kildall in 2010
- Born: Scott Joseph Kildall; 10 May 1969 (age 57); Monterey, California, U.S.
- Education: School of the Art Institute of Chicago
- Movement: Conceptual art
- Parent(s): Gary Kildall; Dorothy McEwen Kildall
- Awards: 2006 Fellow, Kala Art Institute, 2011 Artist in Residence at Recology
- Website: http://kildall.com/

Scott Joseph Kildall (born 10 May 1969) is an American conceptual artist working with new technologies in a variety of media including video art, prints, sculpture and performance art. Kildall works broadly with virtual worlds and in the net.art movement. His work centers on repurposing technology and repackaging information from the public realm into art.

== Early life and education ==
Scott Kildall is the son of computer innovator Gary Kildall. He graduated with an undergraduate degree in Political Philosophy from Brown University in 1991 and received a Master of Fine Arts through the School of the Art Institute of Chicago in the Art and Technology Studies department in 2006.

== Career ==
From 2006 to 2008, Kildall produced “Video Portraits”, a video piece where Kildall asks strangers to pose for a photograph but instead shoots video. The purpose was to record the act of constructing a pose for recorded memory. In 2006, Kildall produced Future Memories, a single-channel video work that uses in-between moments from iconic Hollywood movies. The clips are black-and-white with an ambient soundtrack, which result in a feeling of displaced familiarity as the viewer registers the clips on a subconscious level. In 2007, Kildall's video works were displayed in his first solo show, Imaginary Souvenirs, at Mission 17 gallery in San Francisco.

The socio-historical impacts of media play a role in some of his creations. For example, his 2007 piece, “Uncertain Location”, recreates the Apollo 11 lunar landing in response to an announcement by NASA that it was unable to find the original tapes of the event.

In 2008, he was part of the Mixed Realities exhibition in Boston at Huret & Spector Gallery, curated by Jo-Anne Green from Turbulence.org. In the same year, he exhibited "Hand Work", a performance video based on a film by Andy Warhol at The Textile Museum of Canada. Kildall was an artist-in-residence at Eyebeam in 2009. Kildall created “After Thought” in 2010, a portable personality testing kit which uses a brainwave-reading headset to test stress and relaxation levels with a customized video for each participant. In 2010, Kildall also created “Playing Duchamp”, a chess computer that plays as if it were French artist Marcel Duchamp. Kildall used the recorded matches of Duchamp to mimic the artist's chess style.

== Art work ==
=== Kildall and Second Life ===
Kildall has produced artwork using the video game, Second Life. He is a co-founder of the performance art group, Second Front. His 2006–2007 “Paradise Ahead” print series recreates classic conceptual art by Yoko Ono, Vito Acconci, Bas Jan Ader and others. In 2010, as part of his “No Matter” project with Victoria Scott, Kildall produced “Gift Horse,” a 13-foot high replica of the Trojan Horse. It was built in Second Life and then translated into reality.

=== Video activism ===
In 1999, along with several others, Kildall founded Sleeping Giant Productions in San Francisco, a video organization dedicated to the production of social justice documentaries, which helped establish the video branch of the Independent Media Center. Kildall produced and edited a number of documentary shorts and a feature-length film called “In The Dark”.

=== Wikipedia Art ===
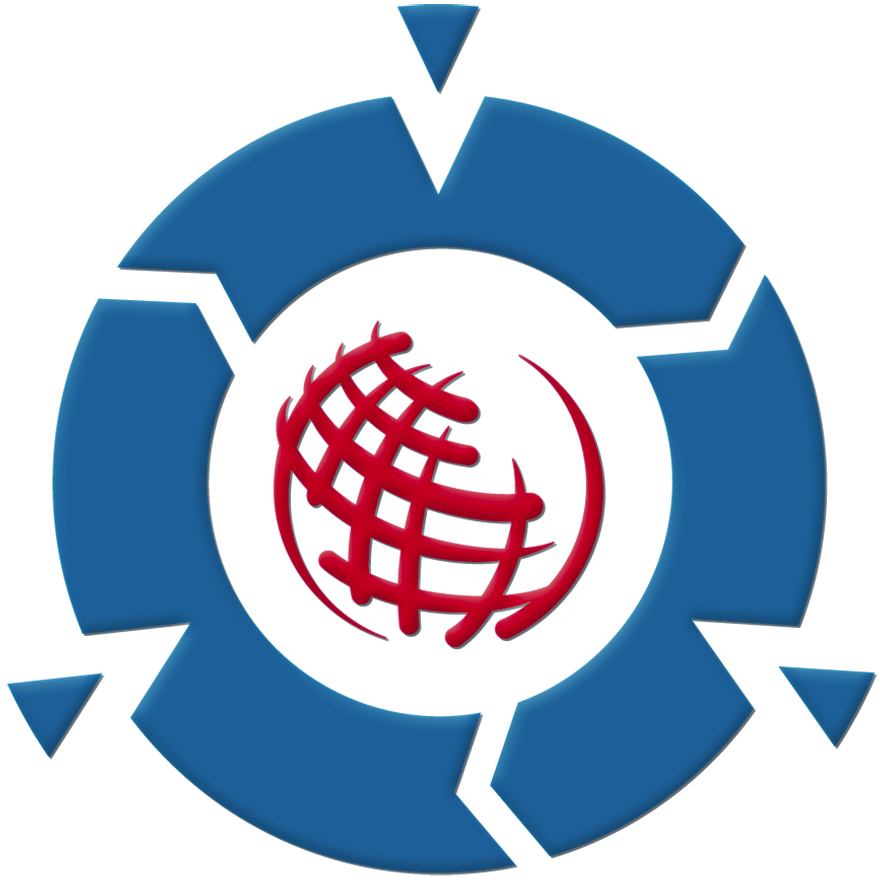
Wikipedia Art logo

In February 2009, Kildall and collaborator Nathaniel Stern created Wikipedia Art, a performance art piece as a live article on Wikipedia. Site editors quickly concluded that the project violated Wikipedia's rules and opted to delete it 15 hours after it was initially posted. A month later, Kildall and Stern received a letter from a law firm representing the Wikimedia Foundation, claiming the domain name, wikipediaart.org, infringed on their trademark. The ensuing controversy was reported in the national press. Wikipedia Art has since been included in the Internet Pavilion of the Venice Biennale for 2009. It also appeared in a revised form at the Transmediale festival in Berlin in 2011.

=== Tweets in Space ===
In 2012, Kildall and Stern again partnered on a project called Tweets In Space, inviting participants to submit tweets to be transmitted to the planet GJ 667Cc, whose conditions scientists believe may be capable of supporting life. Tweets In Space will take place in September 2012 at the International Symposium on Electronic Art in Albuquerque, New Mexico. Kildall and Stern used RocketHub to fundraise the money needed to access a transmitter capable of reaching the planet. In addition, code developed is planned for release to open source. According to Killdall and Stern, the goal of "Tweets In Space" is to activate "a potent conversation about communication and life that traverses beyond our borders or understanding".

=== Infrared Reflections ===
In 2024, Kildall produced a sound installation entitled Infrared Reflections while working as an artist-in-residence at Joshua Tree National Park in California. The piece involves the use of a sensor to detect near-infrared light reflected from Joshua trees, which is then converted to sound, in a process known as sonification.
