= Digital Research =

Defunct American software company

Digital Research, Inc.

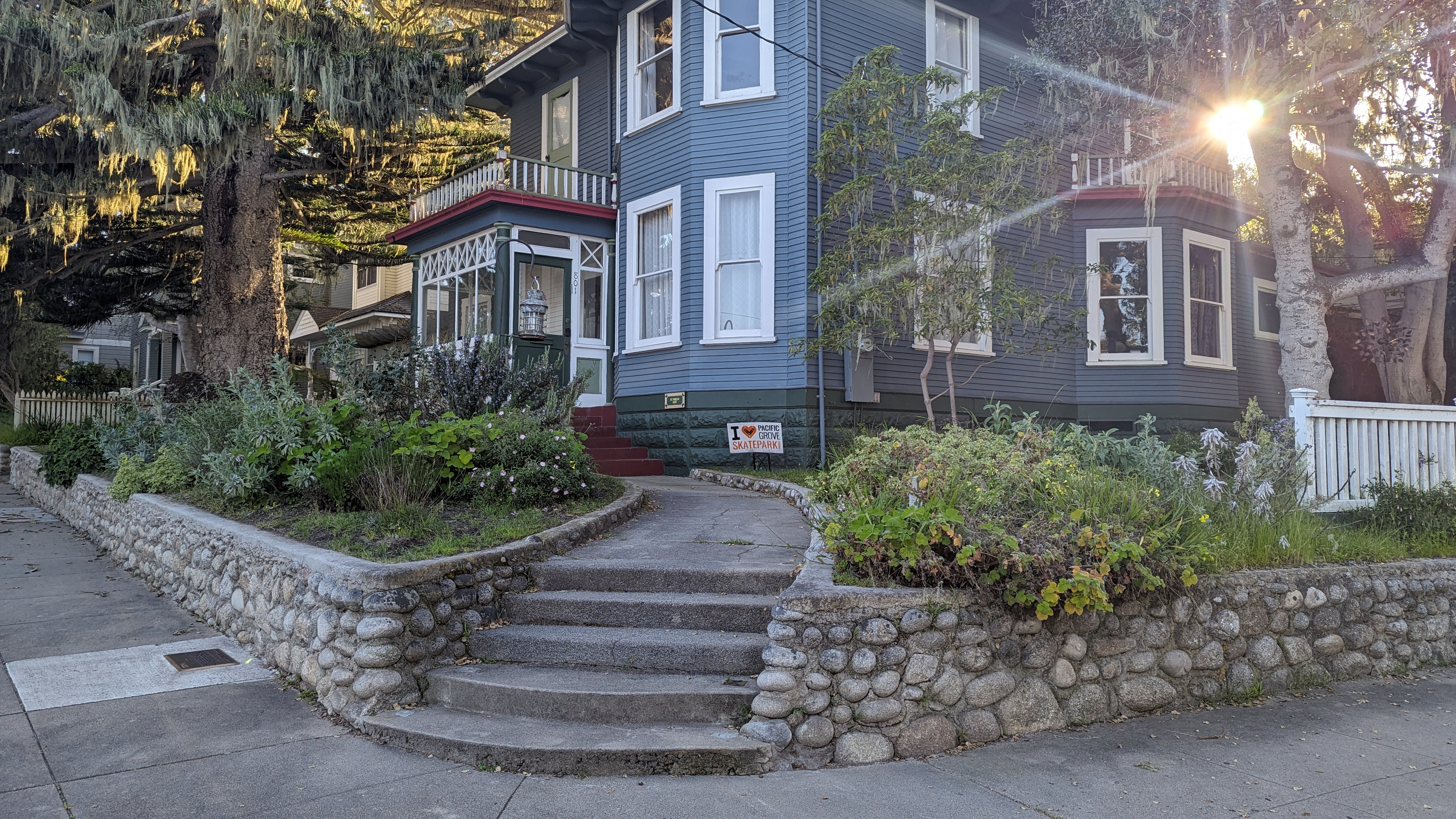
- Original headquarters of Digital Research on 801 Lighthouse Ave, Pacific Grove, California. On the sidewalk, to the left, is a commemorative plaque.
- Type: Private
- Industry: Software
- Founded: 1974; 52 years ago in Pacific Grove, California, U.S.
- Founder: Gary Kildall
- Defunct: 1991; 35 years ago
- Fate: Acquired by Novell
- Headquarters: Pacific Grove, California; Monterey, California
- Key people: Gary Kildall (CEO); Dorothy McEwen Kildall; Gordon Eubanks; Tom Rolander; Kathryn Strutynski; Ed McCracken
- Products: Compilers, operating systems, graphical user interfaces
- Revenue: US$45 million (1983); US$36.2 million (1989); US$40.9 million (1990); US$45.5 million (1991)
- Number of employees: 2 (1976); 9 (November 1978); 24 (August 1980); ~82–100 (1981); ~200 (summer 1982); ~280 (1982); 530 (1983); ~500 (1984); ~300 (1985); 240 (1986); 273 (1990); 290 (1991)
- Website: www.digitalresearch.biz

Digital Research, Inc. (DR or DRI) was a privately held American software company created by Gary Kildall to market and develop his CP/M operating system and related 8-bit, 16-bit and 32-bit systems like MP/M, Concurrent DOS, FlexOS, Multiuser DOS, DOS Plus, DR DOS and GEM. It was the first large software company in the microcomputer world. Digital Research was originally based in Pacific Grove, California, later in Monterey, California.

== History ==
The original Digital Research logo, used from 1977 to the early 1980s

=== 1974–1979: Founding and incorporation ===
In 1972, Gary Kildall, an instructor at the Naval Postgraduate School in Monterey, California, began working at Intel as a consultant under the business name Microcomputer Applications Associates (MAA). By 1974, he had developed Control Program/Monitor, or CP/M, the first disk operating system for microcomputers.

In 1974 he incorporated as Intergalactic Digital Research, with his wife, Dorothy McEwen Kildall, handling the business side of the operation. The company soon began operating under its shortened name Digital Research. The company's operating systems, starting with CP/M for 8080/Z80-based microcomputers, were the de facto standard of their era. Digital Research's product suite included the original 8-bit CP/M and its various offshoots like MP/M (1979), a multi-tasking multi-user version of CP/M.

=== 1980–1990: CP/M, CP/M-86 ===
After Microsoft presented MS-DOS that was based on CP/M, Digital Research released CP/M-86, which was the first 16-bit system (1981, adapted to the IBM PC in early 1982), which was meant as direct competitor to MS-DOS. There followed the multi-tasking MP/M-86 (1981), and Concurrent CP/M (1982), a single-user version featuring virtual consoles from which applications could be launched to run concurrently. The company's documentation had a poor reputation, with Jerry Pournelle in 1982 describing it as seemingly "encrypted and translated into Swahili". and InfoWorld calling its CP/M manuals incomplete, incomprehensible, and poorly indexed.

By 1983, DRI began using distributors to sell its CP/M-86 applications in stores. In May 1983 the company announced that it would offer PC DOS versions of all of its languages and utilities. It remained influential, with US$45 million in 1983 sales making Digital Research the fourth-largest microcomputer software company. Admitting that it had "lost" the 8088 software market but hoped to succeed with the Intel 80286 and Motorola 68000, by 1984 the company formed a partnership with AT&T Corporation to develop software for Unix System V and sell its own and third-party products in retail stores. Pournelle warned later that year, however, that "Many people of stature seem to have left or are leaving Digital Research. DR had better get its act together."

In a parallel development Digital Research also produced a selection of programming language compilers and interpreters for their OS-supported platforms, including C, Pascal, COBOL, FORTRAN, PL/I, PL/M, CBASIC, BASIC, and Logo.

Digital Research developed CP/M-86 as an alternative to MS-DOS and it was made available through IBM in early 1982. The company later created an MS-DOS clone with advanced features called DR DOS, which pressured Microsoft to further improve its own DOS.

At the time the IBM Personal Computer was being developed, Digital Research's CP/M was the dominant operating system of the day. In 1980, IBM asked Digital Research to supply a version of CP/M written for the Intel 8086 microprocessor as the standard operating system for the PC, which would use the code-compatible Intel 8088 chip. Digital Research, uneasy about the conditions related to making such an agreement with IBM, refused.

Microsoft seized this opportunity to supply an OS, in addition to other software (e.g., BASIC) for the new IBM PC. When the IBM PC arrived in late 1981, it came with PC DOS, an OEM version of MS-DOS, which was developed from 86-DOS, which Microsoft had acquired for this purpose. By mid-1982, MS-DOS was also marketed for use in hardware-compatible non-IBM computers. This one decision resulted in Microsoft becoming the leading name in computer software.

This story is detailed from the point of view of Microsoft and IBM in the PBS series Triumph of the Nerds, and from the point of view of Gary Kildall's friends and coworkers in The Computer Chronicles.

The competition between MS-DOS and DR DOS is one of the more controversial chapters of microcomputer history. Microsoft offered better licensing terms to any computer manufacturer that committed to selling MS-DOS with every system they shipped, making it uneconomical for them to offer systems with another OS, since the manufacturer would still be required to pay a license fee to Microsoft for that system. This practice led to a US Department of Justice investigation, resulting in a decision in 1994 that barred Microsoft from "per-processor" licensing.

Successive revisions of Concurrent CP/M incorporated MS-DOS API emulation (since 1983), which gradually added more support for DOS applications and the FAT file system. These versions were named Concurrent DOS (1984), with Concurrent PC DOS (1984) being the version adapted to run on IBM compatible PCs.

In 1985, soon after the introduction of the 80286-based IBM PC/AT, Digital Research introduced a real-time system, initially called Concurrent DOS 286.

Other single-user operative systems were launched: DOS Plus (1985) and DR DOS (1988). The latter system was marketed as a direct MS-DOS/PC DOS replacement with added functionality. In order to achieve this, it gave up built-in support to run CP/M applications and was changed to use DOS-compatible internal structures. It became a successful product line in itself.

=== Graphics Environment Manager (1985) ===
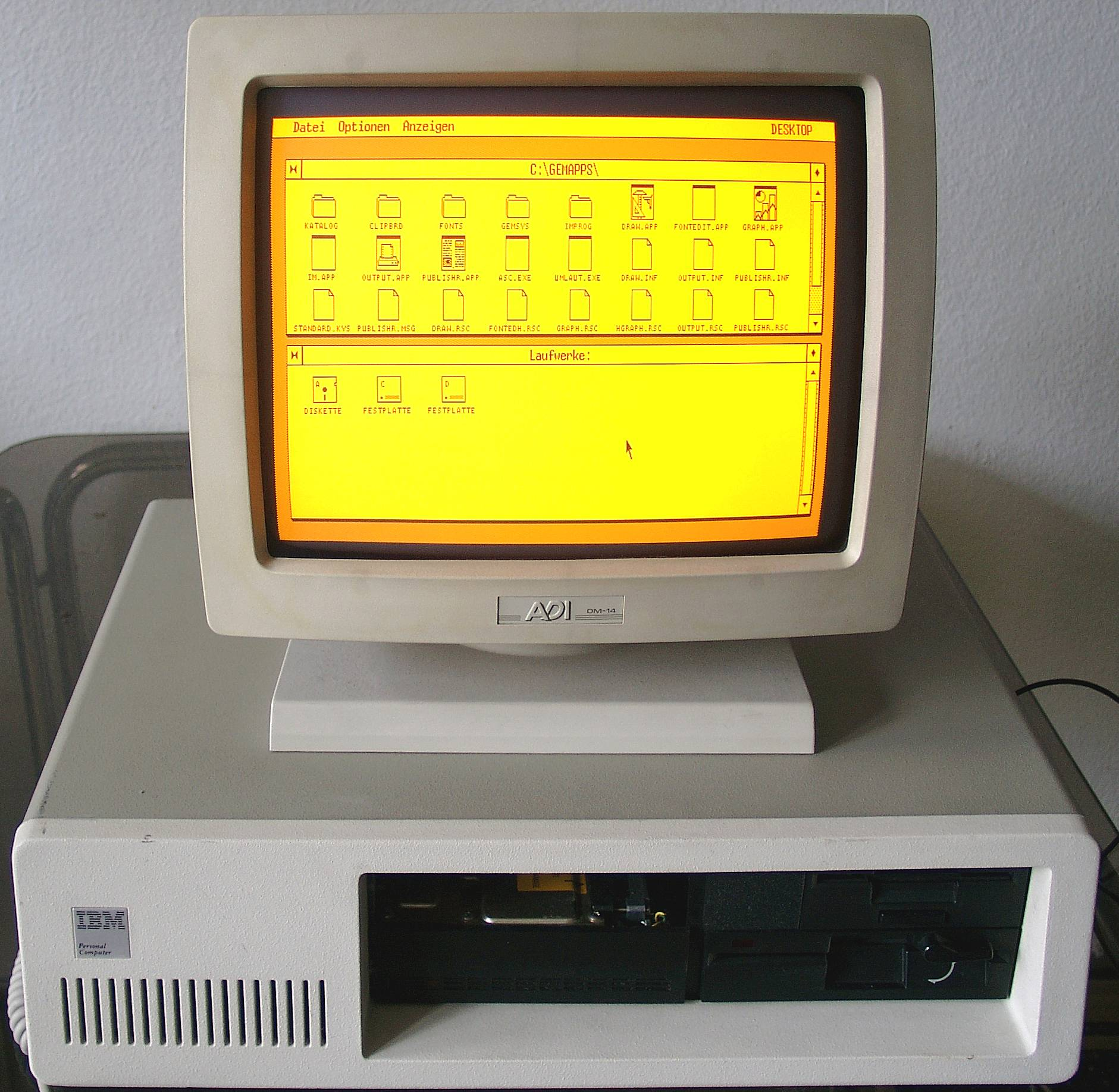
Graphics Environment Manager (GEM) Graphic User Interface (GUI) in 1985

In 1985 Digital Research also produced a microcomputer version of the GKS graphics standard (related to NAPLPS) called GSX, and later used this as the basis of their GEM GUI. Less known are their application programs, limited largely to the GSX-based DR DRAW and a small suite of GUI programs for GEM. After the development of GEM, Microsoft introduced Windows 1.0.

Digital Research (and later its successor Caldera) accused Microsoft of announcing vaporware versions of MS-DOS to suppress sales of DR DOS.

=== FlexOS, Concurrent DOS XM and Concurrent DOS 386 ===
Concurrent PC DOS later evolved into the modular FlexOS (1986). This exploited the greater memory addressing capability of the new CPU to provide a more flexible multi-tasking environment. There was a small but powerful set of system APIs, each with a synchronous and an asynchronous variant. Pipes were supported, and all named resources could be aliased by setting environment variables. This system was to enjoy enduring favour in point-of-sale systems.

Other successors of Concurrent DOS were Concurrent DOS XM (1986) and the 32-bit Concurrent DOS 386 (1987).

=== 1990 and 1991: Multiuser DOS ===
Logo of Digital Research used briefly toward the end of its independent existence, from March 1990 to 1991

In 1991 DR presented Multiuser DOS. Digital Research's multi-user family of operating systems was sidelined with the previous single user operative systems.

In one beta release of Windows 3.1, Microsoft included hidden code (later called the AARD code) that detected DR DOS and displayed a cryptic error message.

== 1991–2014: Acquisition by Novell ==
Digital Research was purchased by Novell for US$80 million in 1991, primarily for Novell to gain access to their operating system line, including FlexOS, which had already been adopted as the basis for Siemens S5-DOS/MT, IBM 4680 OS, and the 4690 OS.

== Acquisitions ==
- Compiler Systems, Inc. (1981) for CBASIC
- MT MicroSYSTEMS, Inc. (1981) for Pascal/MT+

== See also ==
- Multiuser DOS Federation
- Novell Digital Research Systems Group
- Caldera Digital Research Systems Group
