= Gary Kildall =

American computer scientist and microcomputer entrepreneur (1942–1994)

- Kildall at the European Development Centre (EDC) in Hungerford, United Kingdom, 1988
- Born: Gary Arlen Kildall; May 19, 1942; Seattle, Washington, U.S.
- Died: July 11, 1994 (aged 52); Monterey, California, U.S.
- Resting place: Evergreen Washelli Memorial Park
- Education: University of Washington
- Occupations: Computer scientist; entrepreneur
- Years active: 1972–1994
- Known for: Creator of CP/M; Pioneer of the personal computer revolution
- Title: Founder, chairman and CEO of Digital Research
- Board member of: Digital Research
- Spouse(s): Dorothy McEwen Kildall; Karen Kildall
- Children: 2, including Scott

Gary Arlen Kildall (/ˈkɪldɔːl/; May 19, 1942 – July 11, 1994) was an American computer scientist and microcomputer entrepreneur. During the 1970s, Kildall created the operating system CP/M among other operating systems and programming tools, and subsequently co-founded Digital Research, Inc., with his wife Dorothy McEwen Kildall, to market and sell his software products. He is considered a pioneer of the personal computer revolution.

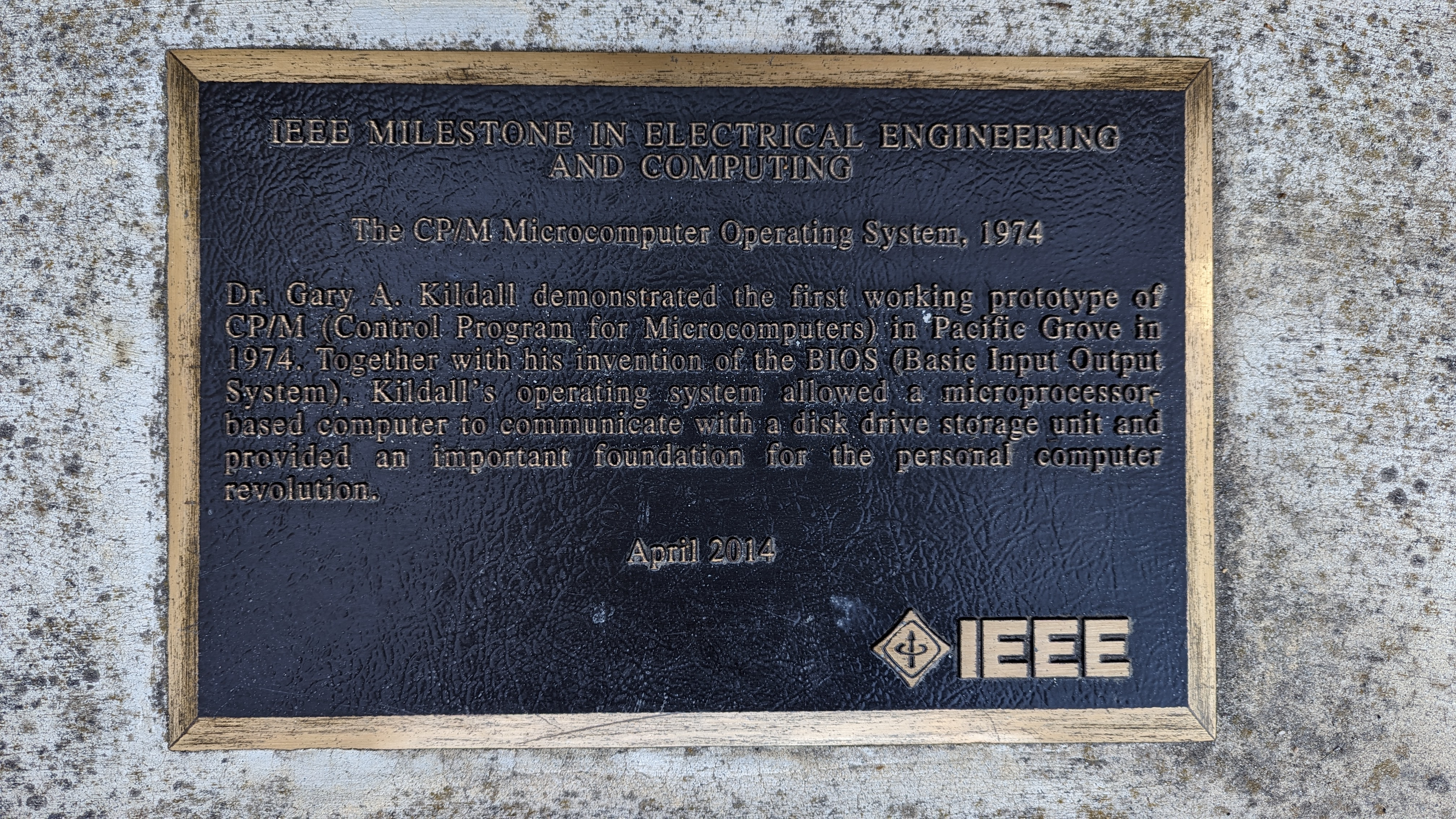
Kildall information plaque Pacific Grove, California

In 1974 in Pacific Grove, California, Kildall demonstrated the first working prototype of CP/M, which would later become the dominant operating system for microcomputers for a time. Together with his invention of the BIOS (Basic Input Output System), his operating system allowed a microprocessor-based computer to communicate with disk storage. Kildall was among the earliest individuals to recognize microprocessors as fully capable computers. During the 1980s, Kildall also appeared on PBS as co-host of Computer Chronicles, a weekly informational program that discussed the latest developments in personal computing.

== Early life ==
Gary Arlen Kildall was born and grew up in Seattle, Washington, where his family operated a seamanship school. His father, Joseph Kildall, was a captain of Norwegian heritage. His mother Emma was of half Swedish ancestry, as Kildall's grandmother was born in Långbäck, Sweden, in Skellefteå Municipality, but emigrated to Canada at 23 years of age.

=== Education ===
Kildall earned a bachelor's degree in mathematics in 1967 and a master's degree in Computer Science in 1968, both from the University of Washington. At one time, he had hoped to become a mathematics teacher. During his studies, Kildall became increasingly interested in computer technology and enrolled to attain a Ph.D. in Computer Science.

Kildall fulfilled his draft obligation by teaching at the Naval Postgraduate School in Monterey, California.

Kildall briefly returned to UW and finished his doctorate in computer science in 1972.

Intel lent him systems using the 8008 and 8080 processors and, in 1973, he developed the first high-level programming language for microprocessors, named PL/M. For Intel he also wrote 8008 and 8080 instruction set simulators named INTERP/8 and INTERP/80. He created the operating system CP/M the same year to enable the 8080 to control a floppy disk drive, combining for the first time all the essential components of a computer system at the microcomputer scale. He demonstrated CP/M to Intel, but Intel showed little interest. However, Intel marketed Kildall's PL/M compiler, running under Intel's own ISIS operating system.

== Business career ==
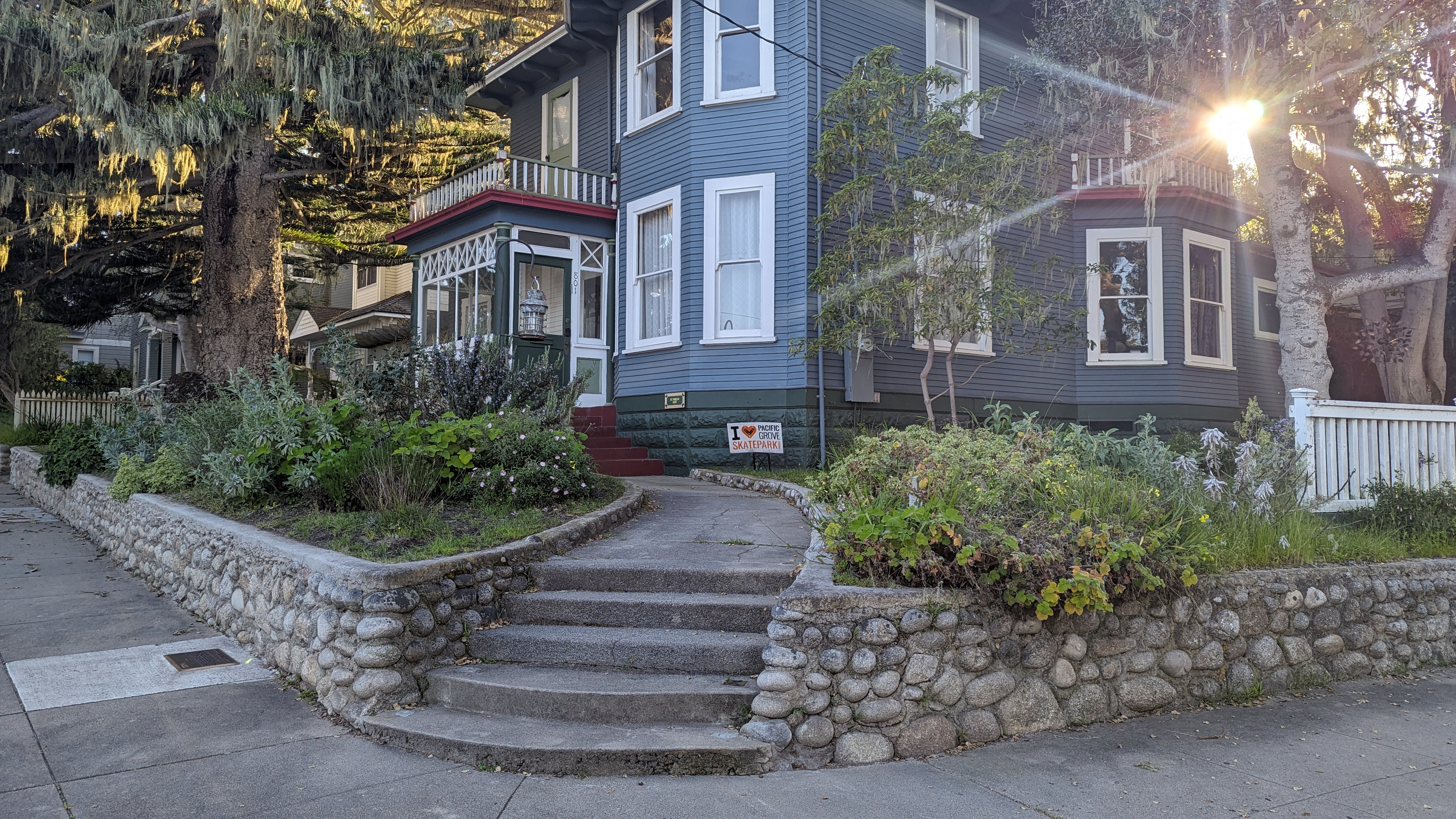
Digital Research house in Pacific Grove, California. On the sidewalk, to the left, commemorative plaque.

Kildall's early career and software projects are described in the book Programmers at Work, a 1986 collection of interviews published by Microsoft Press.

=== CP/M ===
In 1973 Kildall and Kathryn Strutynski developed the language PL/M in order to produce CP/M, one of the first operating systems for personal computers.They used as reference their experience with the IBM mainframe computers and the operating system VM.

Kildall and his wife Dorothy established a company, originally named "Intergalactic Digital Research" (later renamed as Digital Research, Inc.), to market the operating system CP/M by advertisements in hobbyist magazines. Digital Research licensed CP/M for the IMSAI 8080, a popular clone of the Altair 8800. As more manufacturers licensed CP/M, it became a de facto standard and had to support an increasing number of hardware variations. In response, Kildall pioneered the concept of a BIOS, a set of simple programs stored in computer hardware (ROM or EPROM microprocessor) that enabled CP/M to operate on different systems without modification.

CP/M's quick success surprised Kildall, and he was slow to update it for high-density floppy disks and hard disk drives. After hardware manufacturers discussed creating a rival operating system, Kildall started a rush project to develop CP/M 2. By 1981, at the peak of its popularity, CP/M operated on 3000 computer models and DRI had US$5.4 million in yearly revenues.

Between 1983 and 1984, Digital Research offered several of their business and educational applications for the IBM PC on bootable floppy diskettes bundled with SpeedStart CP/M, a reduced version of CP/M-86 as a bootable runtime environment.

=== IBM dealings ===
IBM approached Digital Research in 1980, at Bill Gates's suggestion, to negotiate the purchase of a forthcoming version of CP/M named CP/M-86 for the IBM PC. Gary had left initial negotiations to his wife, Dorothy, as he usually did, while he and Tom Rolander, a colleague and developer of the operating system MP/M, used Gary's private airplane to deliver software to manufacturer Bill Godbout. Before the IBM representatives would explain the purpose of their visit, they insisted that Dorothy sign a non-disclosure agreement. On the advice of DRI attorney Gerry Davis, Dorothy refused to sign the agreement without Gary's approval. Gary returned in the afternoon and tried to resume the discussion with IBM; accounts disagree on whether he signed the non-disclosure agreement, as well as whether he ever met with the IBM representatives.

Various reasons have been given for the two companies failing to reach an agreement. DRI, which had only a few products, might have been unwilling to sell its main product to IBM for a one-time payment rather than its usual royalty-based plan. Dorothy might have believed that the company could not deliver CP/M-86 on IBM's proposed schedule, as the company was busy developing an implementation of the PL/I programming language for Data General. Also possible, the IBM representatives might have been annoyed that DRI had spent hours on what they considered a routine formality. According to Kildall, the IBM representatives took the same flight to Florida that night that he and Dorothy took for their vacation, and they negotiated further on the flight, reaching a handshake agreement. IBM main negotiator Jack Sams insisted that he never met Gary, and one IBM colleague has confirmed that Sams said so at the time. He accepted that someone else in his group might have been on the same flight, and noted that he flew back to Seattle to talk with Microsoft again.

Sams related the story to Gates, who had already agreed to provide a BASIC interpreter and several other programs for the PC. Gates's impression of the story was that Gary capriciously "went flying", as he would later tell reporters. Sams left Gates with the task of finding a usable operating system, and a few weeks later he proposed using the operating system 86-DOS— an independently developed operating system that implemented Kildall's CP/M application programming interface— from Seattle Computer Products (SCP). Paul Allen negotiated a licensing deal with SCP. Allen had 86-DOS adapted for IBM's hardware, and IBM shipped it as IBM PC DOS.

Kildall obtained a copy of PC DOS, examined it, and concluded that it infringed on CP/M. When he asked Gerry Davis what legal options were available, Davis told him that intellectual property law for software was not clear enough to sue. Instead Kildall only threatened IBM with legal action, and IBM responded with a proposal to offer CP/M-86 as an option for the PC in return for a release of liability. Kildall accepted, believing that IBM's new system (like its previous personal computers) would not be a significant commercial success. When the IBM PC was introduced, IBM sold its operating system as an unbundled option. One of the operating system options was PC DOS, priced at US$40. PC DOS was seen as a practically necessary option; most software required it and without it the IBM PC was limited to its built-in Cassette BASIC. CP/M-86 shipped a few months later six times more expensive at US$240, and sold poorly against DOS and enjoyed far less software support.

=== Multi-Programming Monitor Control Program (MP/M) ===
With the loss of the IBM deal, Gary and Dorothy were pressured to bring in more experienced management, and Gary's influence over the company waned. He worked in various experimental and research projects, such as a version of CP/M with multitasking (MP/M), created by Digital Research developer Tom Rolander in 1979. Kildall also worked on an implementation of the Logo programming language. He hoped that Logo, an educational dialect of LISP, would supplant BASIC in education, but it did not.

=== FlexOS ===
In 1985 Digital Research developed FlexOS, a modular real-time multiuser multitasking operating system (RTOS).

=== Graphics Environment Manager (GEM) ===
After seeing a demonstration of the Apple Lisa, Kildall oversaw the creation of DRI's own graphical user interface, named Graphics Environment Manager (GEM), which was introduced on February 28, 1985. Novell acquired DRI in 1991 in a deal that netted millions for Kildall.

Kildall resigned as CEO of Digital Research on 28 June 1985, but remained chairman of the board.

=== Computer Chronicles ===
Kildall co-hosted a public television program produced by PBS named Computer Chronicles. It discussed trends in personal computing. Gary co-hosted the program for seven years during the first eight seasons from 1983 to 1990. After this time the program continued through its 19th season, with the last episode broadcast on June 25, 2002.

=== Activenture ===
In 1984 Gary started another company, Activenture, which adapted optical disc technology for computer use, using as reference the Red Book developed by Sony and Phillips in 1980. In 1985 the CD-ROM was presented by Philips and Sony, the same year Activenture was renamed KnowledgeSet.

==== The Electronic Encyclopedia ====
In June 1985 Activenture released The Electronic Encyclopedia, a CD-ROM version of Grolier's Academic American Encyclopedia. The first computer encyclopedia, it included pictures in 1990 and added audio and videos in 1992. The encyclopedia was acquired by Banta Corporation; its last CD-ROM version was published in 2003.

=== Prometheus Light and Sound (PLS) ===
Kildall's final business venture, known as Prometheus Light and Sound (PLS) and based in Austin, Texas, developed a modular PBX communication system that integrated land-line telephones with mobile phones (called "Intelliphone") to reduce the then-high online costs and to remotely connect with home appliances.

Prometheus Light and Sound system included a UUCP-based store and forward system to exchange emails and files between the various nodes and was planned to include TCP/IP support at a later time.

=== Computer Animation ===
According to Brian Halla, Intel's technical liaison to Digital Research in the 1970s, Gary Kildall showed him a VAX 11/780 running in his house generating a Coke bottle spinning. According to Halla, Kildall sold it a few months later to Pixar.

== Computer Connections ==
In 1992, Kildall was invited to the University of Washington computer science program's 25th anniversary event. As a distinguished graduate of the program, Kildall was disappointed when asked to attend simply as an audience member. He also took offense at the decision to have the main speech done by Bill Gates, a Harvard University dropout who had donated to UW, but had never attended.

In response, Kildall began writing a memoir, entitled Computer Connections: People, Places, and Events in the Evolution of the Personal Computer Industry. The memoir, which Kildall sought to publish, expressed his frustration that people did not seem to value elegance in computer software.

Don't think for a minute that [Bill] Gates made it 'big time' because of his technical savvy.

— Gary Kildall, Computer Connections

Writing about Bill Gates, Kildall described him as "more of an opportunist than a technical type, and severely opinionated, even when the opinion he holds is absurd".

In an appendix, he termed DOS "plain and simple theft" because its first 26 system calls worked the same as CP/M's. He accused IBM of contriving the price difference between PC DOS and CP/M-86 in order to marginalize CP/M.

Kildall had completed a rough draft of the manuscript by the end of 1993, but the full text remains unpublished. Journalist Harold Evans used the memoir as a primary source for a chapter about Kildall in the 2004 book They Made America, concluding that Microsoft had robbed Kildall of his inventions. IBM veterans from the PC project disputed the book's description of events, and Microsoft described it as "one-sided and inaccurate".

In August 2016, Kildall's family made the first seven chapters of Computer Connections available as a free public download.

== Personal life ==
Kildall self-described as a "greaser" during high school, and his colleagues recall him as creative, easygoing, and adventurous. In addition to flying, he loved sports cars, auto racing, and boating, and had a lifelong love of the sea.

I think I'll make a cassette tape of the 'IBM Flying Story.' I'll carry a few copies in my jacket to give out on occasion. There's only one problem. I [will] tell this story [to someone] and, after I'm done, the same person [will say], 'Yeah, but did you go flying and blow IBM off?'

— Gary Kildall, Computer Connections

Although Kildall preferred to leave the IBM affair in the past and to be known for his work before and afterward, there were continual comparisons between himself and Bill Gates, as well as fading memories of his contributions. A legend grew around the fateful IBM-DRI meeting, encouraged by Gates and various journalists, suggesting that Kildall had irresponsibly taken the day off for a recreational flight.

In later years, Kildall privately expressed bitter feelings about being overshadowed by Microsoft, and began suffering from alcoholism.

Selling DRI to Novell had made Kildall a wealthy man, and he moved to the West Lake Hills suburb of Austin. His Austin house was a lakeside property, with stalls for several sports cars, and a video studio in the basement. Kildall owned and flew his own Learjet and had at least one boat on the lake. While in Austin he also participated in volunteer efforts to assist children with HIV/AIDS. He also owned a mansion with a panoramic ocean view in Pebble Beach, California, near the headquarters of DRI.

== Death and legacy ==
On July 8, 1994, at the age of 52, Kildall sustained a head injury at the Franklin Street Bar & Grill, a biker bar in Monterey, California. The exact circumstances of the injury are unclear. Various sources have claimed he fell from a chair, fell down steps, or was assaulted because he had entered the establishment wearing Harley-Davidson leathers. Harold Evans, in They Made America, states that Kildall "stumbled and hit his head" inside the premises, and "was found on the floor".

After the injury, Kildall was discharged from a hospital twice. He was pronounced dead at the Community Hospital of the Monterey Peninsula, on July 11, 1994. An autopsy, performed on July 12, did not conclusively determine the cause of death. Evans states that Kildall's head injury triggered a cerebral hemorrhage, causing a blood clot to form inside the skull. A CP/M Usenet FAQ states that Kildall was concussed due to his injury, and died of heart failure; the relation between the two is unclear. Medical evidence of chronic alcoholism was found during the autopsy.

Initial news reports and police investigation considered Kildall's death as a possible homicide. According to the coroner's report, Kildall's fatal injury may have occurred "as a result of foul play," and the case was referred to the Monterey Police Department. "We're going to investigate it as a possible homicide," said police Sgt. Frank Sollecito. "I'm not going to flat-out say it's a homicide".

Kildall's body was cremated. His remains were buried in Evergreen Washelli Memorial Park, in north Seattle.

=== Recognition ===
After the announcement of Kildall's death, Bill Gates commented that he was "one of the original pioneers of the PC revolution" and "a very creative computer scientist who did excellent work. Although we were competitors, I always had tremendous respect for his contributions to the PC industry. His untimely death was very unfortunate and his work will be missed."

Stewart Cheifet, his co-host on Computer Chronicles, said that Kildall was his "favorite guy" and praised his skills and contributions to the development of personal computing. Cheifet also commented: "Gary's problem was that he was too much of a gentleman. He wasn't a killer business kind of guy", adding that he was "a decent man in a business that was hard to succeed in if you were decent."

In March 1995, Kildall was honored posthumously by the Software Publishers Association (SPA) for his contributions to the microcomputer industry:

- The first programming language and first compiler specifically for microprocessors: PL/M. (1973)
- The first microprocessor disk operating system, which eventually sold a quarter of a million copies: CP/M. (1974)
- The first successful open system architecture by segregating system-specific hardware interfaces in a set of BIOS routines. (1975)
- Creation of the first diskette track buffering schemes, read-ahead algorithms, file directory caches, and RAM drive emulators.
- Introduction of operating systems with preemptive multitasking and windowing capabilities and menu-driven user interfaces (with Digital Research): MP/M, Concurrent CP/M, Concurrent DOS, DOS Plus, GEM.
- Introduction of a binary recompiler and the assembly code translator XLT86. (1981)
- The first computer interface for video disks to allow automatic nonlinear playback, presaging today's interactive multimedia. (1984, with Activenture)
- The file system and data structures for the first consumer CD-ROM. (1985, with KnowledgeSet)

In April 2014, the city of Pacific Grove installed a commemorative plaque outside Kildall's former residence, which also served as the early headquarters of Digital Research.

== In popular culture ==
Steve Hauk wrote a play A Mild Concussion. Later, with Stewart Cheifet, a second version of the play was written under the title The Forgotten Computer Genius. The play looks at the final days of a computer genius.

== See also ==
- History of personal computers
- List of pioneers in computer science
