= North Star Horizon =

Horizon
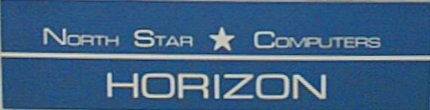

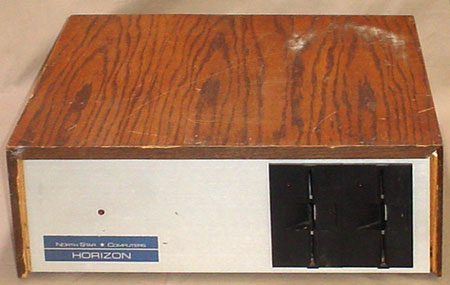
- A North Star Horizon computer
- Manufacturer: North Star Computers
- Type: Personal computer
- Released: November 1977; 48 years ago
- Introductory price: $1899 Assembled; $1599 as a Kit
- Discontinued: Early 1980s
- Units sold: 10,000-100,000+
- Operating system: CP/M, NorthStar DOS
- CPU: Z80 @ 4MHz
- Memory: 16K or more
- Storage: 5.25 floppy drive(s) holds 90KB each
- Display: 80 x 24 text mode
- Graphics: RS-232 port
- Sound: None
- Power: Integrated 250W P.S.U.
- Dimensions: 50.8 x 44.4 x 18.4 cm
- Weight: 20 kg
- Successor: North Star Advantage

The North Star Horizon was a popular 8-bit S-100 bus computer introduced in October 1977. Like most S-100 machines of the era, it was built around the Zilog Z80A microprocessor, and typically ran the CP/M operating system. It was produced by North Star Computers, and it could be purchased either in kit form or pre-assembled. The North Star Horizon was one of the first computers to have built in floppy drives as well as being one of the first personal computers to have a hard disk drive.

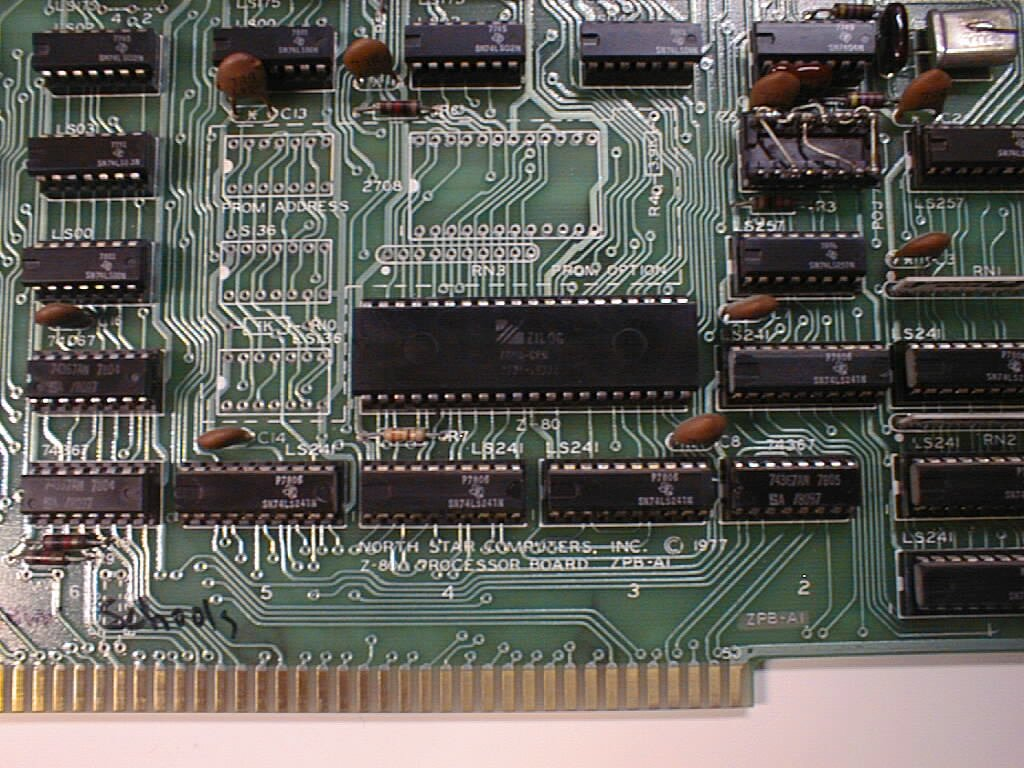
A Z80 processor board for the NorthStar Horizon

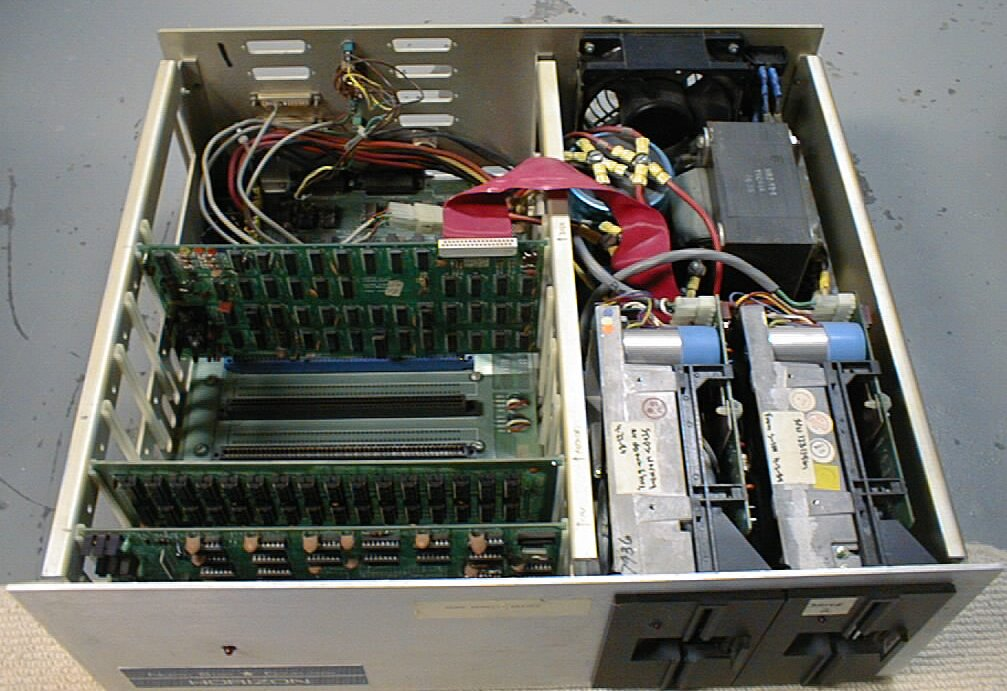
An inside view of the NorthStar Horizon

== Specifications ==
The computer consists of a thick aluminum chassis separated into left and right compartments with a plywood cover which sat on the top and draped over the left and right sides. (It is one of only a handful of computers to be sold in a wooden cabinet. Later versions featured an all-metal case which met safety standards.) The rear section of the compartment on the right held a linear power supply, including a large transformer and power capacitors, comprising much of the bulk and weight of the system. The empty section in front of the power supply normally housed one or two floppy disk drives, placed on their side so the slots were vertical. The compartment on the left held the S-100 motherboard, rotated so the slots ran left-right. Although a few logic circuits were on the motherboard, primarily for I/O functions, both the processor and the memory resided in separate daughterboards.

Capable of running CP/M and NSDOS (North Star's proprietary Disk Operating System), a standard North Star system sported one or two hard-sectored single sided 5.25 inch floppy disk drives. Within a year a double density floppy controller board was released that supported double sided drives giving 360KB per disk. The base unit had a serial interface to which one could connect a terminal to interact with it. NSDOS included North Star BASIC, a slightly non-standard dialect of BASIC, where some standard BASIC commands of the day had been changed, probably to avoid potential legal issues. Two examples of this were the EXAM and FILL commands, which took the place of the more common PEEK and POKE.

The Horizon was superseded by the all-in-one North Star Advantage in 1982. The Horizon found a niche in University environments where its inbuilt S-100 bus could be used to interface it to a variety of control systems.

North Star released a hard disk version, with an internal full height 5MB MFM drive. They also released an S-100 card with integrated memory and two serial ports which allowed up to eight users on one Horizon, each with their own CPU sharing the disk and other resources. This operated under TurboDOS, a multi user CP/M variant with some Unix-like features.

== Software ==
There are 35 commercial games for North Star Horizon

Game	Year	Publisher
Adventure	1979	Creative Computing Soft.
Adventures #1~#3	1982	Adventure International
Adventures #10~#12	1982	Adventure International
Adventures #4~#6	198?	Adventure International
Adventures #7~#9	1982	Adventure International
Backgammon 2.0	1981	DynaComp, Inc.
Blackjack Coach	1983	DynaComp, Inc.
Bridge 2.0	1979	DynaComp, Inc.
Bridge Master	1982	DynaComp, Inc.
Chess Master	1981	DynaComp, Inc.
Cranston Manor Adventure	1981	DynaComp, Inc.
Evilk	1978	Creative Computing Soft.
Game Pak I	1981	DynaComp, Inc.
Game Pak II	1981	DynaComp, Inc.
Games. Vol. 1	1978	MicroAge
Games. Vol. 2	1978	MicroAge
Gigatrek	1982	Artworx Soft. Co., Inc.
Hearts	1980	DynaComp, Inc.
Management Simulator	1981	DynaComp, Inc.
Mensa Master	1982	DynaComp, Inc.
Monarch	198?	DynaComp, Inc.
North Star Software Exchange #1: Games	1979	North Star Computers
North Star Software Exchange #11: Life Expectancies & Capitals Quiz	1979	North Star Computers
North Star Software Exchange #13: Games	1979	North Star Computers
North Star Software Exchange #18: Video Games	1979	North Star Computers
North Star Software Exchange #3: Guess Game System	1979	North Star Computers
North Star Software Exchange #7: SOL/VDM Video Games	1979	North Star Computers
North Star Software Exchange #8: Simulation-type Games	1979	North Star Computers
Poker Party	1980	DynaComp, Inc.
Poker Tourney	1982	Artworx Soft. Co., Inc.
Qubic	1978	1001001, Inc.
Space Lanes	198?	DynaComp, Inc.
Uncle Harry's Will	1982	DynaComp, Inc.
Valdez	1979	DynaComp, Inc.
Windmere Estates Adventure	1982	DynaComp, Inc.
