= Videoton =

Videoton may refer to:

- Videoton (company), Hungarian electronics company
- Fehérvár FC, formerly known as Videoton FC, Hungarian football club

== See also ==
- Vidéotron, a Canadian telecommunications company
