= North Star Computers =

Defunct American computer company (1976–1984)

- Industry: Computer industry
- Founded: 1976; 50 years ago
- Founders: Mark Greenberg; Charles Grant
- Defunct: 1989; 37 years ago
- Headquarters: Berkeley, California, U.S.
- Products: North Star BASIC; North Star Horizon

North Star Computers Inc. (later styled as NorthStar) was an American computer company based in Berkeley, California, that existed between June 1976 and 1989. Originally a mail order business for IMSAI computers, it soon developed into a major player in the early microcomputer market, becoming first known for its low-cost floppy disk system for S-100 bus machines, and later for its own S-100 bus computers running either the CP/M operating system or North Star's own proprietary operating system, NSDOS. North Star BASIC was a common dialect of the popular BASIC programming language. It later expanded its lineup with dual-CPU machines able to run MS-DOS, and a server version running either DOS or Novell NetWare.

While initially successful, North Star's sales suffered from the company's adherence to hard sector floppy drives, which made software difficult to port onto North Star machines. It was no longer a significant factor in the industry by the time less-expensive CP/M computers with built-in displays (and soft-sectored drives), such as the Osborne and the Kaypro, were released. Sales slowed during the growth of the PC market.

== History ==
The company was formed by Mark Greenberg and Charles Grant, who started Kentucky Fried Computer to handle retail and mail order sales of IMSAI computers in Berkeley in June 1976. According to one source, a lawsuit from Kentucky Fried Chicken led to the name change.

=== FPB ===
North Star's first product was the Floating Point Board, an S-100 bus card that implemented a floating point coprocessor for 8080-based machines. The company later added RAM boards and Z80A processor cards to its lineup.

=== Micro-Disk System (1976) ===
North Star's next product was a hard sectored floppy disk system based on a 5-inch Shugart Associates SA-400 mechanism with 89 kB capacity. This was coupled with an S-100 bus controller and ROM that included bootstrap code and shipped with North Star DOS and North Star BASIC. The MDS system cost US$699 and could be plugged into any S-100 bus machine, and was one of the earliest disk systems affordable for the average hobbyist. With the North Star installed, startup went from a lengthy process of manually entering a "loader" program through front-panel switches, to simply setting the run address to E800 on the address switches and flicking the RUN switch.

North Star later updated the disk drive to support double-density disks with 180 kB, and later still double-sided, double-density disks with 360 kB of storage. However, the double-density product was pre-announced and sales of the original single-density, single-sided model ended overnight. The sudden loss of income almost bankrupted the company, and is used as an example of the Osborne effect in action.

=== North Star Horizon (1977) ===
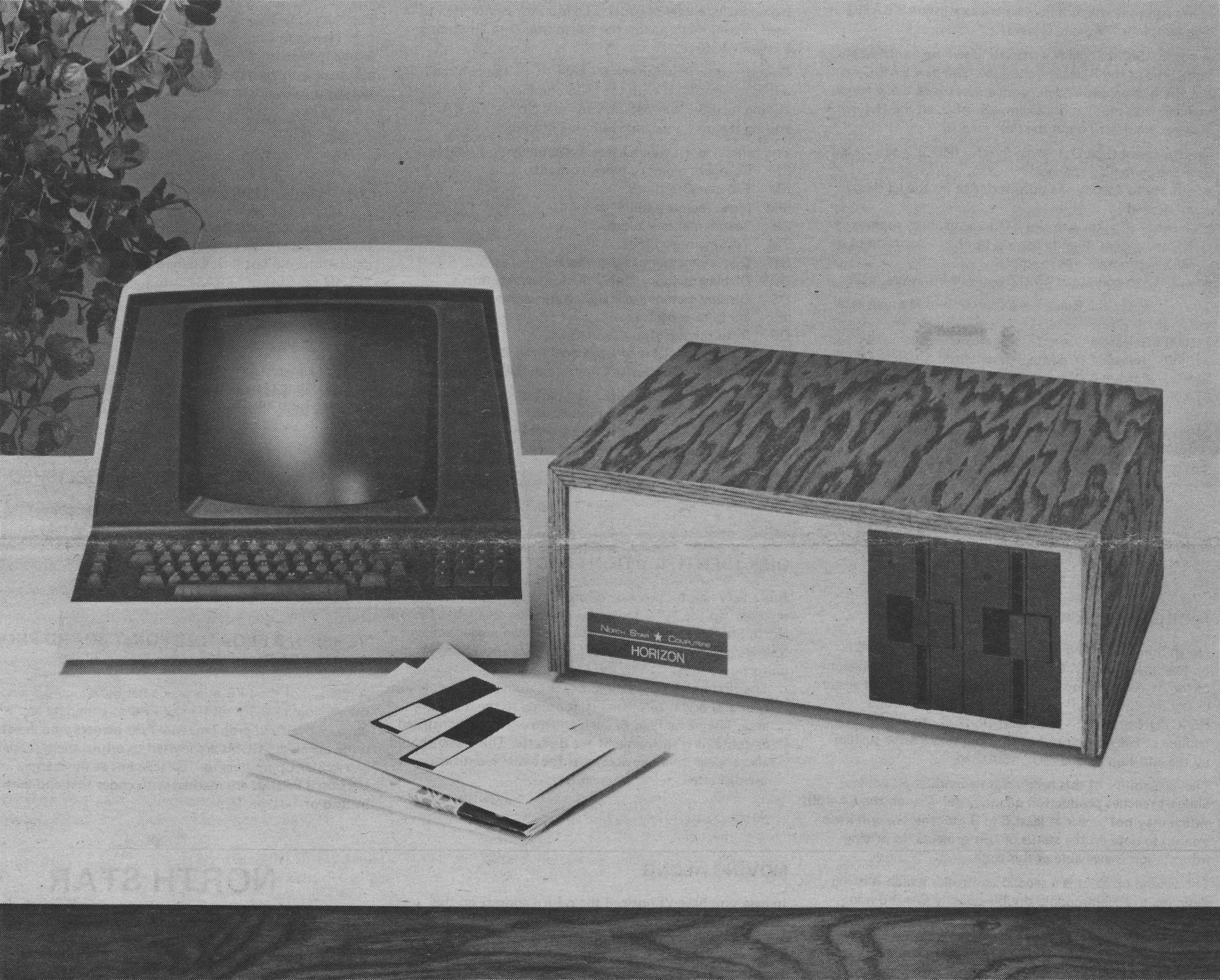
The North Star Horizon computer, pictured with a terminal and floppy disks

The Horizon was an 8-bit 4 MHz Zilog Z80A-based computer, typically with 16 KB to 64 KB of RAM. It had one or two single-sided single or double density hard sectored floppy disk drives (externally expandable to 3 or 4), and serial interfaces connected it to a computer terminal and a printer. It ran CP/M or North Star's own proprietary NSDOS. It also included many chips on the motherboard that would otherwise require separate S-100 cards in other systems, thereby allowing the machine to operate "out of the box" with minimal setup.

Announced in November 1977, the Horizon was one of the earliest systems to include built-in drives. The cabinet held up to 12 additional S-100 cards, with at least some of these used for memory cards. With one floppy drive the kit cost $1,599, while an assembled system cost $1,899. With two drives the kit cost $1,999, while an assembled system cost $2,349.

Early machines used a wooden cabinet and sported a logo placard with the company name stylized "NorthStar". Later machines used an all-metal case and the name was separated (as in the image on this page).

=== North Star Advantage (1982) ===
The Advantage was an all-in-one 4 MHz Z80A-based computer with 64 KB of user RAM and 20 KB of graphics RAM. It used two double-sided, double-density 360 kB floppy disk (hard-sectored) drives and an optional 5 MB Winchester disk. The Advantage was known for its 640×240 graphics capabilities and was sold with four demonstration programs, one of which plotted and calculated a pattern of lines reminiscent of the Arcade game Qix. The Advantage also had an optional 8088 co-processor board available that ran MS-DOS 1.0. When the Advantage was introduced NorthStar had moved its offices, manufacturing and warehousing facilities to 14440 Catalina St. in San Leandro, California. NorthStar remained at that location until it ceased operations.

=== North Star Dimension (1984) ===
North Star in 1982 reached revenues of $41 million and had after-tax profit of $3.69 million. However, the growing success of the IBM PC diminished demand for North Star's CP/M-based offerings, and the company reported losses in 1983. To turn around fortunes, it introduced the Dimension—a server computer, and North Star's first fully PC-compatible product. Based on the 80186 chip at the server, the Dimension employed multiple screens each connected to a PC-compatible 8086-based slot card that mounted in the server. The screens and keyboards then connected to the workstation cards in the server. The unit shipped with MS-DOS and Novell NetWare was available as an option; the Dimension was one of the first computers ever to offer NetWare as a software pack-in. The Dimension brought North Star out of its sales slump, and profits doubled into the second quarter of 1984.

=== After 1984 ===
After giving North Star $3.7 million in debt financing, Fortune Systems Corporation, a Unix workstation manufacturer based in Redwood City, California, was in talks to acquire North Star for $14 million in August 1984. The deal fell through in October 1984, however, with North Star and Fortune agreeing to collaborate on forthcoming hardware projects nonetheless.

Among North Star's last products was an upgrade to the Dimension—the Dimension 300—in 1987, and the EL family of multi-user system ISA expansion cards for the PC, based on the Intel 8088, 286 and 386, in 1988. The company dissolved in 1989.
