= CPMulator =

- Developer: Keystone Software Development
- Release: 1984; 42 years ago
- Operating system: MS-DOS
- Platform: x86
- Type: Emulator
- License: Proprietary software

CPMulator is a program to emulate the CP/M operating system under PC DOS / MS-DOS for IBM PC compatibles. The program was developed in 1984 by Keystone Software Development. The company was owned and operated by Jay Sprenkle.

The NEC V20 processor released that year was guaranteed to be hardware compatible with the Intel 8088. After reviewing the instruction timing of the math operations and instruction addressing hardware it was determined it could slightly speed up existing 8088 based IBM PC machines. Keystone software started advertising "PC Speedup Kits" in PCWeek magazine. The CPU was socketed in IBM PC's so it could easily be replaced. In practice most programs received a 5% speed increase but those that were math intensive were much improved. One customer reported his monte carlo simulation of a nuclear reactor was so much faster that he "double checked the results because he couldn't believe it was finished."

CPMulator was developed after the release of the V20. The processor can also emulate the Intel 8080 instruction set in hardware. This opened the possibility of running older code on the new IBM machines. CPMulator was designed to modify CP/M binaries to make them run as if native 8088 DOS programs. The code to put the CPU in emulation mode was prefixed to each CP/M executable. Any calls to the CP/M operating system were intercepted and translated to DOS operating system calls. The program would leave 8080 emulation mode, make the operating system call, translate the results to CP/M standards and return to emulation mode and continue the original program.

The product went out of production after IBM PC AT class machines became prevalent and NEC produced no V series pin for pin compatible version of 80286 processor.
