= Gnat Computers =

American computer company (1976–1983)

Gnat Computers, Inc.
- Type: Private
- Industry: Computers
- Founded: 1976; 50 years ago in San Diego, California
- Founders: Thomas Lafleur
- Defunct: 1983; 43 years ago
- Fate: Acquired by Data Technology Industries, Inc.

Gnat Computers, Inc. (also spelled GNAT Computers) was an American computer company based in San Diego, California, founded in 1976. The company was an early developer of microcomputers and one of the first—if not the first—to license the CP/M operating system from Digital Research. They released various computer hardware, including two microcomputer systems, before they were acquired by business partner Data Technology Industries, Inc., in 1983.

== History ==
Brochure for the Gnat System 10 (1979)

Gnat Computers was founded in early 1976 and formally incorporated in San Diego, California, in August 1976. Thomas Lafleur was among the company's co-founders. Gnat's first product was the Gnat MC80 (also known as the Gnat 8080 System), a single-board computer. Released in early 1976, the MC80 runs off an Intel 8080 microprocessor and features 256 bytes of RAM, expandable to 512 bytes; the system board also has spots for up to 2 KB worth of programmable ROMs. It was delivered as either bare assembled circuit boards or with an optional chassis containing a front panel for input and maintenance. Gnat recommended their MC80 for industrial process applications. To this end, they also sold a communications-control expansion board, which hooks up to the main board via a socket-and-ribbon-cable arrangement.

In mid-1976, the company delivered pre-assembled hardware multiply–divide operator modules for several other early 8080-based microcomputers, including the Altair 8800 and Intel's MDS and Intellec 8 Mod 80, as well as for their own MC80. Each module was available in a 2.5-μs and 5-μs variant, the latter being $50 cheaper. The Southern California Computer Society measured Gnat's 2.5μs modules as performing multiplication and division between 100 and 160 times faster than common software approaches for such arithmetic at the time; in fact, they said the modules were so fast that they completed their operations quicker than the 8080 microprocessor can access the result.

Gnat released the first of their 8080-based Gnat-Pac family of microcomputers in 1977, starting with the System 8. The System 8 featured optional built-in dual 5.25-inch floppy disk drives capable of writing 80-KB-formatted disks. The computer featured 16 KB of RAM, eight PROM modules (one 2-KB PROM included, featuring the bootstrap loader and memory monitor), serial and parallel I/O ports. Gnat followed up with the Gnat-Pac System 9 in 1978, which bumped the floppy disk capacity to 500 KB, expandable to 1 MB. The computer came shipped with a disk operating system, CP/M. Gnat was perhaps the first company to license CP/M for a microcomputer, the purchase mediated between developer Digital Research and Gnat's Lafleur. Lafleur managed to secure perpetual rights to use the operating system for a bargain $90 in 1977. Within the year, the price of a corporate CP/M license had skyrocketed to tens of thousands of dollars.

In 1979, Gnat teamed up with Data Technology Industries (DTI) of San Leandro, California, to develop the Gnat System 10, an all-in-one microcomputer based on the Zilog Z80 microprocessor. The System 10 featured 65 KB of RAM; a built-in CRT supported by a video card that could output 80-column-by-25-row text; two 700-KB 5.25-inch floppy drives; a Selectric-style keyboard; and a hard drive interface. The company sold 2,000 units of the System 10 between 1979 and 1980. In 1981 Gnat signed an agreement with the Maryland-based American Peripheral Systems to supply the latter with $12 million of Gnat's microcomputers in exchange for dealership representation in 20 states and Washington, D.C., over a five-year contract.

DTI acquired Gnat in 1983 and continued selling the System 10 into the mid-1980s. The company subsumed Gnat's computer manufacturing, rebranding the System 10 as "The Associate".
