= Videoton TV-Computer =

1980s Hungarian home computer

TV-Computer
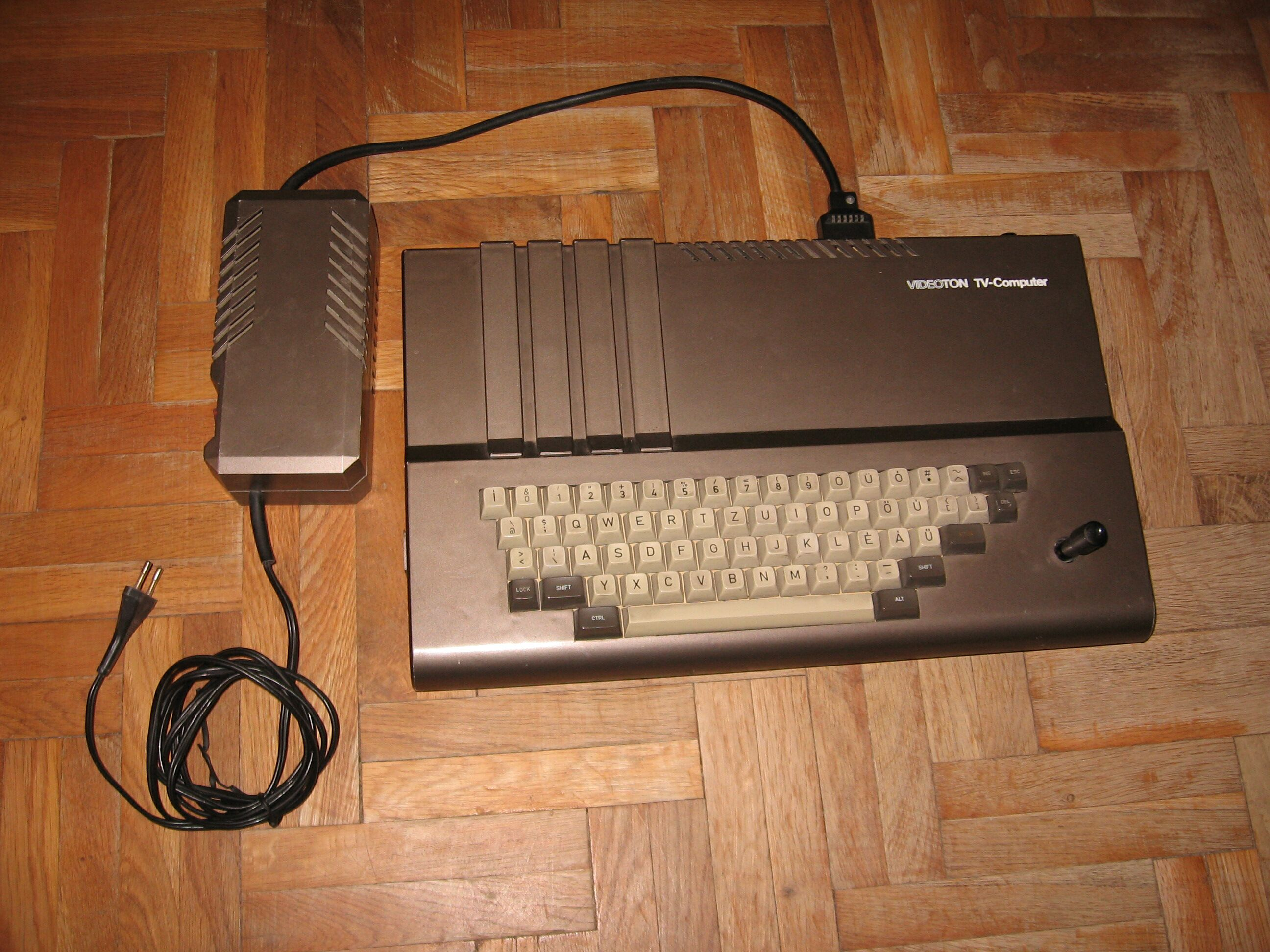
- A Videoton TVC home computer main unit and power supply
- Also known as: TVC
- Developer: Videoton
- Manufacturer: Videoton
- Type: home computer
- Released: around 1986
- Units sold: around 12000
- Operating system: TVC OS, UPM, BASIC
- CPU: Zilog Z80 compatible
- Memory: 32/64 kilobytes
- Graphics: 128×240/16 colors, 256×240/4 colors, 512×240/2 colors (b&w)

The TV-Computer (or TVC in short) is an 8-bit home computer which was manufactured by the Hungarian company Videoton around 1986. The computer was based on the Enterprise and had a built-in BASIC interpreter. Programs could be loaded via tape or floppy. It had a built-in joystick and a keyboard with Hungarian letters and nine function keys.

There are three different models of the TVC:

- 32k which has 32 KB of RAM
- 64k which has 64 KB of RAM
- 64k+ which has 64 KB of RAM and a newer BASIC interpreter (v2.2) and more video RAM (64 Kb instead of 16 KB)

The TVC has three graphical modes: 128×240/16 colors, 256×240/4 colors, and 512×240/2 colors (black and white). There was no text mode, only graphical. This made the computer a bit slow and smooth scrolling is pretty challenging (though there are examples for vertical and horizontal scrolling games nowadays).

Few programs existed for the computer. Many of these were written by dedicated amateurs and were distributed by mail.

It has two tape ports, one A/V, one RGB monitor, one RF connector, one Centronics printer port, one side (for program-modules - game cartridges) and four upper (computer internals are almost exposed) expansion ports and two joystick ports (compatible with Atari-style joysticks, but may have two buttons).

The four upper expansion ports made this computer very versatile. The official floppy solution was connected to one of these ports, the RS-232 card also was plugged here. The classroom network card also used this port, the planned game card (with sprite capabilities) also would have used this port - unfortunately there are only some pictures about the prototype module and some documents mention it. Even a SID card was created, using a SID chip to enhance the TVC sound capabilities.

Current enhancements using these ports are: SD card reader, sound card (with 3 different sound chips), game card (+2 joystick ports +SN76489 sound chip + 4 built-in games), HDMI output with several FPGA cores (ofc including TVC), USB/PS/2 mouse handling (and an unreleased gamecard with SID and sprite support) and many more.

== Games ==
There are 100 games from commercial publishers for the Videoton TV-Computer

Name	Year	Publisher
21	198?	SiL Software in LUX
5 Labdajáték	1987	Novotrade
Amoba	198?	Videoton Hungary
A Bolygó Neve - Halál	1988	Berysoft
Banánfaló	198?	Berysoft
Banánfaló	198?	Novotrade
Bányász	198?	Novotrade
Bázis	198?	SiL Software in LUX
Boszorkánykonyha - Kalandozások a Kémiában	1987	Novotrade
Búvár	198?	Berysoft
Buvar Kaland + Ijasz Verseny	198?	Novotrade
Centaury	198?	Novotrade
Centaury-1	198?	Novotrade
Ciklon	198?	SiL Software in LUX
Commando	1989	Berysoft
Commando	1987	SiL Software in LUX
Crazy Kangaroo	1986	Videoton Hungary
Demo Kazetta 01 - Bevezetés	198?	Videoton Hungary
Demo Kazetta 02 - Tili-Toli	198?	Videoton Hungary
Demo Kazetta 03 - Rajzoló	198?	Videoton Hungary
Demo Kazetta 04 - Zene	198?	Videoton Hungary
Demo Kazetta 05 - Betükészítö, Bombázó	198?	Videoton Hungary
Drawer	198?	SiL Software in LUX
Egybeirjam? Különírjam? 1	1988	Novotrade
Egybeirjam? Különírjam? 2	1988	Novotrade
Ejtöernyö	198?	SiL Software in LUX
Expedíció	1989	Berysoft
Fekete Sólyom	198?	SiL Software in LUX
Felderítö	198?	SiL Software in LUX
Festö játék	198?	Novotrade
Fizikai összefüggések	1987	Novotrade
Forma-1 Hungaroring	198?	Novotrade
Geo	1987	Videoton Hungary
Geometriai Transzformációk	1988	Novotrade
Golf	198?	Berysoft
Griff	198?	SiL Software in LUX
Harc a Föld Körül	198?	Novotrade
Harc a föld körül	198?	Videoton Hungary
Hungaroring	198?	Novotrade
Jet Pack	198?	SiL Software in LUX
Kazettás Szövegszerkesztö TV-Computerre	198?	Novotrade
Keresd a gyürüt	198?	SiL Software in LUX
Kísértetkastély 1	198?	SiL Software in LUX
Körmöci arany	198?	Novotrade
Korongbiliárd	198?	SiL Software in LUX
Ladderman	1989	Berysoft
Létra	198?	Novotrade
Level Three	198?	SiL Software in LUX
Lift	198?	SiL Software in LUX
Lovagi Torna	1988	Berysoft
Magyarország	198?	SiL Software in LUX
Marokkó	198?	Videoton Hungary
Minotaurusz	198?	Novotrade
Mr. Alex	1985	Videoton Hungary
Nagy Függvényábrázoló	1987	Novotrade
Ninja	198?	Novotrade
Olajsejk	198?	SiL Software in LUX
Orjarat	198?	Novotrade
Othello	198?	Novotrade
Pack Man	198?	Videoton Hungary
Póklakoma	1987	Novotrade
Poseidon Kincse	1989	Novotrade
Reflex	198?	SiL Software in LUX
Robin Hood	198?	Novotrade
Robin Hood - Íjászverseny	198?	Berysoft
RoHAMM	1989	Novotrade
Sakk - Cyrus II	1985	Novotrade
Space Invaders	1986	Videoton Hungary
Space Sapper	1987	Novotrade
Sprinter	198?	Berysoft
Sprinter	198?	SiL Software in LUX
Star Wars	198?	SiL Software in LUX
Szakmai számítások	198?	SiL Software in LUX
Szánkóverseny	1985	Videoton Hungary
Színre színt	198?	Berysoft
Szonda	198?	SiL Software in LUX
Szörny	198?	SiL Software in LUX
Telex - 1500 szó magyarul 1	1988	Novotrade
Telex - 1500 szó magyarul 2	1988	Novotrade
Tetris	198?	Videoton Hungary
Tower	198?	Berysoft
Turbó Rudi	1987	Novotrade
Turbó Rudi	1987	Videoton Hungary
TV Ball	1988	Novotrade
TV Póker	198?	Novotrade
TV-Stack	1987	Novotrade
Urhódító	1986	Videoton Hungary
Ursikló	198?	SiL Software in LUX
Varázsecset	1988	Novotrade
Varázsgömb	198?	Berysoft
Varázsgömb	198?	Videoton Hungary
Videoton	198?	Videoton Hungary
Vigyori	198?	SiL Software in LUX
Volleyball	1990	Berysoft
Volleyball	1990	Videoton Hungary
VT Bridzs	198?	Videoton Hungary
Wimbledon	198?	SiL Software in LUX
Windsurfer	198?	Novotrade
Zenegyár	1989	SiL Software in LUX
Zsír	198?	Berysoft
