= SmartKey =

Processing program

SmartKey was the first macro processing program of its type, and the first terminate-and-stay-resident program for CP/M and MS-DOS / PC DOS microcomputers.

Smartkey's "keyboard definitions" were first used with the early word-processing program WordStar for such things as changing margins of screenplays. Thousands of other uses were made for the program.

SmartKey was originally written by Nick Hammond, an admiral in the Royal Australian Navy, and originally published by Software Research Technologies, founded by Stan Brin and Reid H. Griffin.

SmartKey received two Editor's Choice awards from PC Magazine due to its tight code and powerful features, but was never able to counter the marketing muscle of its largest competitor, SuperKey, a product of Borland International. SmartKey 6.0, the final version, was released in May 1990, with the Program Design credited to Nick Hammond and the actual program to Nick Hammond and Bill Dunn; Executive Services Inc. published that final version for No Brainer Software in two editions, "SmartKey Junior" and "SmartKey Advanced," which added additional features, including custom screens, programming and branching logic, context-sensitive macros (based on screen condition, time of day, and so forth), as well as calling DOS functions.
