= Videoton (company) =

Holding company in Székesfehérvár, Hungary

VIDEOTON HOLDING ZRt. (VIDEOTON Group)
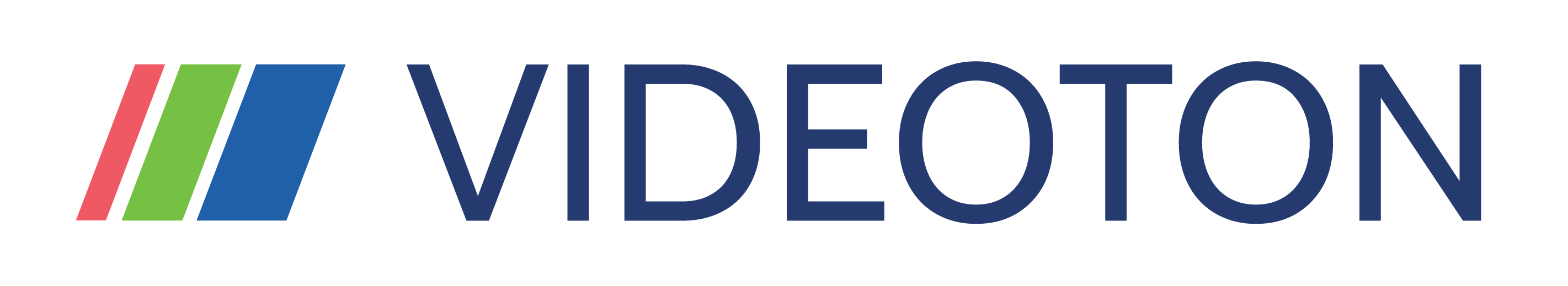

- VIDEOTON Székesfehérvár Industrial Zone - 2025
- Type: Private
- Industry: Electronic Manufacturing Services, Contract Manufacturing
- Founded: 1938
- Headquarters: Székesfehérvár, Hungary
- Number of locations: Number of locations: 9 locations in Hungary, 1 location in Bulgaria, 1 location in Germany, 1 location in USA
- Area served: Worldwide
- Key people: Gábor Széles, Chairman; Péter Lakatos, Co-CEO; Ottó Sinkó, Co-CEO
- Services: Various contract manufacturing and manufacturing-related services
- Revenue: ▲749 000 000 € (2025)
- Net income: 60,900,000 euro (2018)
- Number of employees: 8300 (2025)
- Website: www.videoton.hu

Videoton, officially VIDEOTON HOLDING Ltd., is a privately owned company group based out of Székesfehérvár, Hungary, and specializing in contract manufacturing, mainly electronics manufacturing services (EMS). The company was founded in 1938 and it became well known among the Warsaw Pact/Comecon countries for supplying stadium-sized electronic scoreboards. In 1991 the company was privatized and since then Videoton has provided contract manufacturing services for its partners.

It ranks 33rd globally and 3rd in EU according to the 2021 EMS-ranking of Manufacturing Market Insider magazine. The estimated value of the group (consisting of 21 member companies) is 640 million Euro according to the 2022 survey of Forbes. The company has 10 locations, mainly in Hungary, 1 in Bulgaria (Stara Zagora) and 1 in Germany (Limburg), and 1 in the USA (Aurora, CO). Beside these, the company group operates few industrial zones as well.

== History ==
=== 1938-1991: The early years and the state era of VIDEOTON ===
The legal predecessor of VIDEOTON was founded in 1938. After World War II, the company was rebuilt, and owned by the state between 1955 and 1991. It developed, produced and sold Videoton branded consumer, computer and defense electronics. The company's named officially became VIDEOTON Electronics in 1981. After the political changes in the early 90s – especially due to the cancelled orders of the East-European market – the company got into difficult situation, causing its liquidation to begin in 1991. The current shareholders and Hungarian Credit Bank and Euroinvest Ltd. acquired the company's assets in a public tender.

=== 1991-1995: Consolidation and building out the contract manufacturing structure ===
The re-organized company continued its contract manufacturing activity mainly with legacy projects (RCD2 precision mechanical assembly for Philips, speakers for Opel and oil pumps for SHW). After the crisis management the intense market and contact building work started, and the first outsourcing projects took place mainly for entertainment-, automation- and automotive industry customers (Mars Electronics, AFL).

In connection with the IBM Slider project, the production of computer components for well-known multinational companies started, while cable assembly operations with more than 1,000 employees were implemented in Enying and Veszprém. Although TV production ceased by 1995, VIDEOTON started to manufacture industrial electronics with ABB, and the consumer electronics business also ran up thanks to its partnership with Matsushita-Bosch (MB) Video.

Meanwhile, the transformation of the Székesfehérvár site into an industrial park also started.

EUROTON-Elektronikai Kft., VIDEOTON-MECHLABOR Kft., AFL Videoton Kft. (today: VIDEOTON Autoelectronics Ltd.) were founded.

=== 1996-2000: Stabilization and optimization ===
The private owners acquired the 100% control of the company after a MBO in 1996. The consumer electronics and automotive segments continued to develop through collaborations with multinational partners such as Kenwood, Panasonic and Texas Instruments.

The Plastic business unit split from VT GALVANO PLASTIC Ltd., and today's VT Plastic Ltd. was established. MKBE company (today: VIDEOTON Elektro-PLAST Ltd.) in Kaposvár was bought in 1997, where the assembly of Sanyo battery packs started. With this the company stepped into the battery-pack market. Also quality assurance improvements took place: VIDEOTON Autoelectronics Ltd. received QS 9000 and VDA 6.1 certification.

VT Transman Ltd. was established in 1998. The company entered the small kitchen appliances market (Philips DAP manufacturing in Kaposvár). Stamping plant started in Törökszentmiklós. Also the entertainment electronics product portfolio expanded: VIDEOTON Audio Ltd. started the production of professional speaker boxes. The production of loudspeakers for automotive industry for Goodmans was newly started in Videoton's Kunhegyes site. Videoton became a regional CEM company group at the end of the millennium by buying BRG Ltd., Semilab Ltd. and DZU AD in Stara Zagora (Bulgaria).

=== 2000-2004: IT sector-crisis, redesign ===
The group, which was on growth path, tried to maintain its development with product development- and product launch services at the beginning of the 2000s. Also, VIDEOTON improved the technological level with further investments: the first BGA implantation and testing production line was put into operation. Thanks to that production of set-top-box for Bull Electronics could be started. The first Videoton-designed production line for Denso was completed. This resulted in the start of a new division in VT Informatika Ltd, which later separated as VT ASYST Ltd. Due to the many new projects, the expansion of Videoton Elektro-Mechanics started and a new electronics assembly hall was built.

VT Metal Ltd. was established by merging galvanizing and metalworking in 2002. Meanwhile, the production of defense (military) electronics ceased and the crisis affecting the emerging IT sector led to a significant portfolio change: the production of labor-intensive consumer electronics and IBM products were lost by VIDEOTON, while consumer and industrial electronics projects became increasingly important. In addition, further collaborations that required vertical integration (e.g., Microsense, a company that developed traffic management systems) improved the situation, while the automotive profile was also expanding.

VT Metal Ltd. and VT Autoelectronics Ltd. obtained ISO / TS 16949 certification, and VIDEOTON EAS Kft. was established.

=== 2005-2007: On growth path again ===
Following the downturn in the IT sector in previous years, thanks to the parallel increasing share of the automotive, industrial and consumer electronics industries in Videoton's portfolio, the group turned on a growth path and partnered with new multinational companies (Saia Burgess, Visteon, Braun, 3M, Sagem, Samsung).

KVJ Művek Ltd. was acquired by VIDEOTON group in 2006, and so VIDEOTON became a supplier to Suzuki Swift. The year after the 5th plant of VIDEOTON Autoelectronics Ltd. was opened, and the production of Braun irons begun in Kaposvár in a 5000 m2 new building.

=== 2008-2011: Increasing efficiency in the recession ===
The sheet metal processing site in Törökszentmiklós was integrated into VT INFORMATIKA Ltd., thus formulated the present-day VT ES Ltd. Videoton bought the Marcali site, and established the new Ukrainian site as well, that was involved to serve wire harness assembly for AFL. In 2009, IMS Ltd. was established, which was responsible for managing the trade of goods at the Ukrainian site. Also an office in Ukraine was opened.

Despite the crisis, important investment projects took place: construction of 2 new galvanic lines at VT Metal Ltd. started. Hager moved the production of hundreds of products to VIDEOTON EAS Ltd. The purchase of the first Fuji NXT line took place. Electrostatic powder coating technology started at VT ES Ltd. The wire harness assembly project in Ukraine ramped up employing nearly 1,000 people.

Videoton opened up to new markets such as green energy, and industrial air technology at the end of the decade by acquiring STS Group Ltd. and Ventifilt Ltd. Finishing of low voltage circuit breakers started at VT METAL Ltd. for Eaton / Möller. The modernization of SMD insertion capacity with FUJI NXT machines (installation of 8 production lines by 2013) took place at VIDEOTON Autoelectronics Ltd.

=== 2012-2019: Dynamic growth ===
The acquisition of direct majority ownership of STS Technology Ltd. (today: VT Mechatronics Ltd.) -that was formerly a member of STS Group – took place in 2011. It is specialized in the integration of high complexity machines. VT ASYST Ltd was established also this year. The company plans and produces special machines, production equipment, testers and production lines

VIDEOTON celebrated its 75th birthday in 2013, and reached 100 billion HUF turnover (337 million Euro). By this time electronics assembly represented the largest share in the portfolio. Videoton was awarded with Bisnode Reliability Award in 2014.

Tipa Ltd. producing special machines mainly for Audi, was acquired by VIDEOTON in 2015. Production of Formlabs 3D printer was started by the company group, that required the cooperation of several group members. The revenue reached again a record level this year: it was 150 billion HUF (484 million Euro).

The VT EAS, member company of 25-year-old „new” VIDETON founded a Bulgarian affiliate (VEAS BG Ltd.) in 2016., and improved its assembly capacity further: production of AVM routers started by the company this year.

The growth of revenue continued further (it exceeded 170 billion HUF in 2017), while huge investment projects started in 2018: As a greenfield investment, a new electronics production hall of 20,000 m2 was built. VT EAS Ltd. moved in. Also, a 500 kilowatt solar park was launched at the Székesfehérvár site in 2019. In addition, sales revenue in 2019 reached 190 billion HUF.

=== 2020-: New Challenges ===
Despite the extraordinary challenges of the 2020s (COVID, supply chain problems, the Russian-Ukrainian war, the energy crisis), the VIDEOTON group's sales revenue in HUF is growing year on year between 2020 and 2023 (2020 – HUF 195 billion, 2021 – HUF 222 billion, 2022 – HUF 286 billion, 2023 - HUF 311 billion), while in 2024, mainly due to the downturn in the European economy and the automotive industry, sales revenue will decrease slightly (HUF 305 billion).

Despite the challenges, the company's business positioning has improved by taking advantage of new business opportunities. (e.g., electromobility, battery technology, and emerging collaborations with start-up companies.)

In 2020, automotive production declined due to the pandemic, but the group was involved in the manufacture of certain electronic products related to electric and hybrid vehicles. In addition, the production of several products related to environmental protection and driver assistance systems was launched. The group expanded its activities in the field of medical devices as well: ViVideoton (company). obtained ISO 13485 certification. The assembly of battery-powered portable power sources and the manufacture of their plastic components began, and electric car charging equipment was also produced. The manufacture of containers and complete equipment for the energy industry was launched.

Several anniversaries were celebrated in 2021: the Kaposvár site celebrated its 50th anniversary, Ventifilt in Hajdúnánás celebrated its 60th anniversary, and the "new" VIDEOTON celebrated its 30th anniversary. During the year, the group launched new projects, but the global shortage of raw materials slowed growth in the second half of the year.

In 2022, despite the war in Europe, the energy crisis, and further global uncertainties, the group's developments continued in Bulgaria as well as Hungary: they announced the expansion of the capacity of VIDEOTON EAS's plant in Stara Zagora. VIDEOTON HOLDING ZRt. was included in the Priority Exporter Program.

Ukrainian employees were already working for the group before the outbreak of the war. After February 24, 2022, they were primarily involved in organizing the accommodation of their family members in Hungary, providing them with lodging and care. The following year, a new workers' hostel was established in the Industrial Park in Székesfehérvár, which, among other things, serves to accommodate workers arriving from Ukraine.

In 2023, a 1 MW solar park was handed over in the Industrial Park in Székesfehérvár. The development of the Bulgarian site continued; the production hall, renovated as part of an investment worth around EUR 10 million, was handed over in the summer of 2024, marking the 25th anniversary of the company's presence in Bulgaria. On May 30, 2025, at the investment handover ceremony held in Stara Zagora, the VEAS Bulgaria electronics manufacturing plant was opened, which obtained IATF certification, thereby becoming accredited for the manufacture of automotive products.

In the summer of 2025, VIDEOTON HOLDING signed an agreement with the owners of Limtronik GmbH, whereby Limtronik GmbH, which employs 150 people in Limburg near Frankfurt, and Limtronik USA in Denver became members of the VIDEOTON group. At VIDEOTON's 2025 year-end event, management evaluators said the group expects growing challenges and VIDEOTON's 2025 revenue to be around HUF 300 billion.

== Activity Breakdown ==
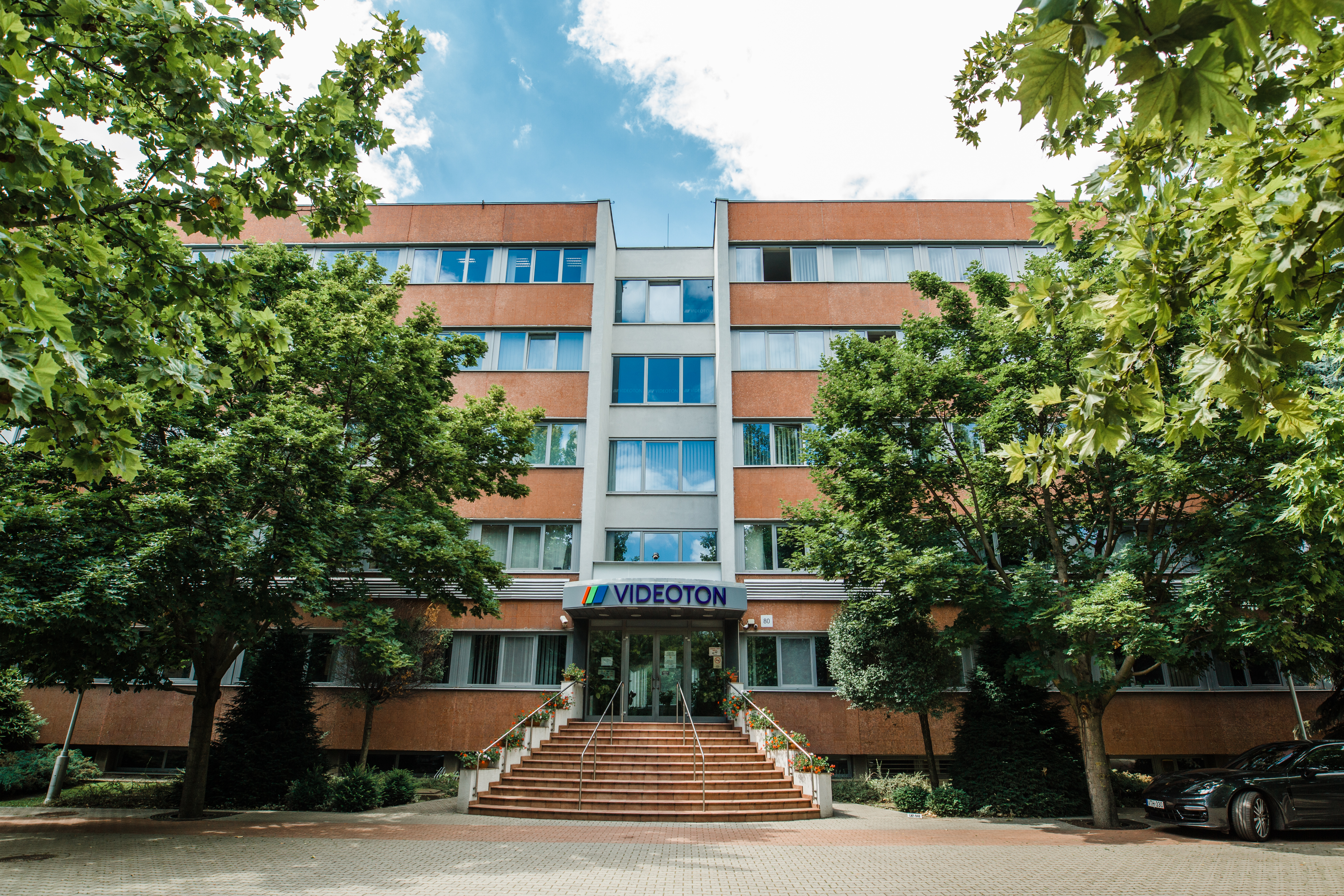
Headquarters of Videoton in the city of Székesfehérvár, Hungary.

By 2020, the automotive component industry (manufacturing of electronic components, metal parts and automotive plastics) accounted for the largest share of VIDEOTON's activity, followed by industrial electronics and mechanical manufacturing, as well as consumer electronics and healthcare products. Computer technology, consumer electronics and telecommunication manufacturing has been representing an increasing share within the portfolio from 2015 onwards.

The contribution of production supporting services to sales revenue is also significant.

== Organization Structure ==
The member companies of VIDEOTON HOLDING Ltd. can be split into manufacturing and service companies.

=== Manufacturing companies ===
- PCBA & Box build assembly
  - VIDEOTON Autoelectronics Ltd. (Székesfehérvár, Hungary)
  - VIDEOTON EAS Ltd. (Székesfehérvár, Hungary)
  - VIDEOTON EAS Bulgaria (Stara Zagora, Bulgaria)
- Part manufacturing & Box build assembly
  - VIDEOTON Elektro-PLAST Ltd. (Kaposvár, Hungary)
  - VIDEOTON Battery Technologies Ltd. (Marcali, Hungary)
  - VT ES Ltd. (Székesfehérvár, Hungary)
  - VT BH d.o.o (Stara Zagora, Bulgaria)
  - VT Mechatronics Ltd. (Győr, Hungary)
  - VT Tipa Ltd. (Győr, Hungary)
  - VT Asyst Ltd. (Székesfehérvár, Hungary / Szabadka, Serbia)
- Part manufacturing. & Heavy duty assembly
  - VT Plastic Ltd. (Székesfehérvár / Veszprém, Hungary)
  - VT Bulplast d.o.o (Stara Zagora, Bulgária)
  - VT METAL Ltd. (Székesfehérvár, Hungary)
  - VT Precíziós Ltd. (Székesfehérvár, Hungary)
  - VT Rendszertechnika Ltd. (Székesfehérvár, Hungary)
  - KVJ Művek Ltd. (Nagyvenyim, Hungary)
  - Ventifilt Ltd. (Hajdúnánás, Hungary)
- Service companies:
  - Pannonjob Ltd.
  - VIDEOTON Ipari Park Vállalat
  - VT ARtrans Ltd.
  - Pannonfacility Ltd.

== See also ==
- Fehérvár FC, formerly known as Videoton FC
