= Hard sectoring =

Method of sectoring drives

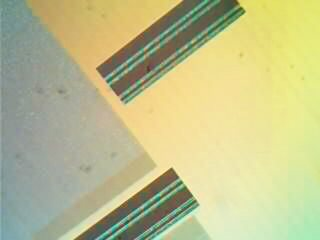
These rectangles constitute the hard (factory originated) sectoring of a DVD-RAM disc

Hard sectoring in a magnetic or optical data storage device is a form of sectoring which uses a physical mark or hole in the recording medium to reference sector locations.

In older 8- and 5 1/4-inch floppy disks, hard sectoring was implemented by punching sector holes in the disk to mark the start of each sector. These were equally spaced holes, at a common radius. This was in addition to the index hole, situated between two sector holes, to mark the start of the entire track of sectors. When the index or sector hole was recognized by an optical sensor, a sector signal was generated. Timing electronics or software would use the faster timing of the index hole between sector holes, to generate an index signal. Data read and write is faster in this technique than soft sectoring as no operations are to be performed regarding the starting and ending points of tracks.

== Storage formats using hard sectoring ==
- 32 sector 8-inch floppy disks
- 10 sector and 16 sector 5 1/4-inch floppy disks
- Numerous magneto-optical formats
- DVD-RAM
