= List of operating systems =

This is a list of operating systems. Computer operating systems can be categorized by technology, ownership, licensing, working state, usage, and by many other characteristics. In practice, many of these groupings may overlap. Criteria for inclusion is notability, as shown either through an existing Wikipedia article or citation to a reliable source.

== Proprietary ==
=== Acorn Computers ===
- Arthur
- ARX
- MOS
- RISC iX
- RISC OS

=== Amazon ===
- Fire OS

=== Amiga Inc. ===
- AmigaOS
  - AmigaOS 1.0-3.9 (Motorola 68000)
  - AmigaOS 4 (PowerPC)
- Amiga Unix (a.k.a. Amix)

=== Amstrad ===
- AMSDOS
- Contiki
- CP/M 2.2
- CP/M Plus
- SymbOS

=== Apple ===
- Apple II
  - Apple DOS
  - Apple Pascal
  - ProDOS
  - GS/OS
  - GNO/ME
  - Contiki
- Apple III
  - Apple SOS
- Apple Lisa
- Mac
  - Classic Mac OS
  - A/UX (UNIX System V with BSD extensions)
  - Copland
  - MkLinux
  - Pink
  - Rhapsody
  - macOS (formerly Mac OS X and OS X)
    - macOS Server (formerly Mac OS X Server and OS X Server)
- Apple Network Server
  - IBM AIX (Apple-customized)
- Apple MessagePad
  - Newton OS
- iPhone and iPod Touch
  - iOS (formerly iPhone OS)
    - iPad
      - iPadOS
    - Apple Watch
      - watchOS
    - Apple TV
      - tvOS
    - Embedded operating systems
      - bridgeOS
    - Apple Vision Pro
      - visionOS
- Embedded operating systems
  - A/ROSE
  - iPod software (unnamed embedded OS for iPod)
  - Unnamed NetBSD variant for Airport Extreme and Time Capsule

=== Apollo Computer, Hewlett-Packard ===
- Domain/OS – One of the first network-based systems. Run on Apollo/Domain hardware. Later bought by Hewlett-Packard.

=== Atari ===
- Atari DOS (for 8-bit computers)
- Atari TOS
- Atari MultiTOS
- Contiki (for 8-bit, ST, Portfolio)

=== BAE Systems ===
- XTS-400

=== Be Inc. ===
- BeOS
  - BeIA
  - BeOS r5.1d0
    - magnussoft ZETA (based on BeOS r5.1d0 source code, developed by yellowTAB)

=== Bell Labs ===
- Unix ("Ken's new system," for its creator (Ken Thompson), officially Unics and then Unix, the prototypic operating system created in Bell Labs in 1969 that formed the basis for the Unix family of operating systems)
  - UNIX Time-Sharing System v1
  - UNIX Time-Sharing System v2
  - UNIX Time-Sharing System v3
  - UNIX Time-Sharing System v4
  - UNIX Time-Sharing System v5
  - UNIX Time-Sharing System v6
    - MINI-UNIX
    - PWB/UNIX
      - USG
        - CB Unix
  - UNIX Time-Sharing System v7 (It is from Version 7 Unix (and, to an extent, its descendants listed below) that almost all Unix-based and Unix-like operating systems descend.)
    - Unix System III
    - Unix System IV
    - Unix System V
      - Unix System V Releases 2.0, 3.0, 3.2, 4.0, and 4.2
  - UNIX Time-Sharing System v8
  - UNIX Time-Sharing System v9
  - UNIX Time-Sharing System v10

Non-Unix Operating Systems:

- BESYS
- Plan 9 from Bell Labs
- Inferno

=== Burroughs Corporation, Unisys ===
- Burroughs MCP

=== CII ===
- Siris 8

=== Commodore International ===
- GEOS
- AmigaOS
- AROS Research Operating System

=== Control Data Corporation ===
==== Lower 3000 series ====
- SCOPE (Supervisory Control Of Program Execution)

==== Upper 3000 series ====
- SCOPE (Supervisory Control Of Program Execution)
  - Drum SCOPE

==== 6x00 and related Cyber ====
- Chippewa Operating System (COS)
  - MACE (Mansfield and Cahlander Executive)
    - Kronos (Kronographic OS)
      - NOS (Network Operating System)
        - NOS/VE (NOS Virtual Environment)
  - SCOPE (Supervisory Control Of Program Execution)
    - NOS/BE NOS Batch Environment
- SIPROS (Simultaneous Processing Operating System)

==== Star-100 ====
Multiple Console Time Sharing System (MCTS), from General Motors Research

=== CloudMosa ===
- Puffin OS

=== Convergent Technologies ===
- Convergent Technologies Operating System (CTOS) – later acquired by Unisys

=== Cromemco ===
- Cromemco DOS (CDOS) – a Disk Operating system compatible with CP/M
- Cromix – a multitasking, multi-user, Unix-like OS for Cromemco microcomputers with Z80A and/or 68000 CPU

=== Data General ===
- AOS for 16-bit Data General Eclipse computers and AOS/VS for 32-bit (MV series) Eclipses, MP/AOS for microNOVA-based computers
- DG/UX
- RDOS Real-time Disk Operating System, with variants: RTOS and DOS (not related to PC DOS, MS-DOS etc.)

=== Datapoint ===
- CTOS Cassette Tape Operating System for the Datapoint 2200
- DOS Disk Operating System for the Datapoint 2200, 5500, and 1100

=== DDC-I, Inc. ===
- Deos – Time & Space Partitioned RTOS, Certified to DO-178B, Level A since 1998
- HeartOS – POSIX-based Hard Real-Time Operating System

=== Digital Research, Inc. ===
- CP/M
  - CP/M CP/M for Intel 8080/8085 and Zilog Z80
    - Personal CP/M, a refinement of CP/M
    - CP/M Plus with BDOS 3.0
  - CP/M-68K CP/M for Motorola 68000
  - CP/M-8000 CP/M for Zilog Z8000
  - CP/M-86 CP/M for Intel 8088/8086
    - CP/M-86 Plus
    - Personal CP/M-86
  - MP/M Multi-user version of CP/M-80
    - MP/M II
  - MP/M-86 Multi-user version of CP/M-86
    - MP/M 8-16, a dual-processor variant of MP/M for 8086 and 8080 CPUs.
  - Concurrent CP/M, the successor of CP/M-80 and MP/M-80
  - Concurrent CP/M-86, the successor of CP/M-86 and MP/M-86
    - Concurrent CP/M 8-16, a dual-processor variant of Concurrent CP/M for 8086 and 8080 CPUs.
  - Concurrent CP/M-68K, a variant for the 68000
- DOS
  - Concurrent DOS, the successor of Concurrent CP/M-86 with PC-MODE
    - Concurrent PC DOS, a Concurrent DOS variant for IBM compatible PCs
    - Concurrent DOS 8-16, a dual-processor variant of Concurrent DOS for 8086 and 8080 CPUs
    - Concurrent DOS 286
    - Concurrent DOS XM, a real-mode variant of Concurrent DOS with EEMS support
    - Concurrent DOS 386
      - Concurrent DOS 386/MGE, a Concurrent DOS 386 variant with advanced graphics terminal capabilities
  - Concurrent DOS 68K, a port of Concurrent DOS to Motorola 68000 CPUs with DOS source code portability capabilities
  - FlexOS 1.0 – 2.34, a derivative of Concurrent DOS 286
    - FlexOS 186, a variant of FlexOS for terminals
    - FlexOS 286, a variant of FlexOS for hosts
      - Siemens S5-DOS/MT, an industrial control system based on FlexOS
      - IBM 4680 OS, a POS operating system based on FlexOS
      - IBM 4690 OS, a POS operating system based on FlexOS
        - Toshiba 4690 OS, a POS operating system based on IBM 4690 OS and FlexOS
    - FlexOS 386, a later variant of FlexOS for hosts
      - IBM 4690 OS, a POS operating system based on FlexOS
        - Toshiba 4690 OS, a POS operating system based on IBM 4690 OS and FlexOS
    - FlexOS 68K, a derivative of Concurrent DOS 68K
  - Multiuser DOS, the successor of Concurrent DOS 386
    - CCI Multiuser DOS
    - Datapac Multiuser DOS
      - Datapac System Manager, a derivative of Datapac Multiuser DOS
    - IMS Multiuser DOS
      - IMS REAL/32, a derivative of Multiuser DOS
        - IMS REAL/NG, the successor of REAL/32
  - DOS Plus 1.1 – 2.1, a single-user, multi-tasking system derived from Concurrent DOS 4.1 – 5.0
  - DR-DOS 3.31 – 6.0, a single-user, single-tasking native DOS derived from Concurrent DOS 6.0
    - Novell PalmDOS 1.0
    - Novell "Star Trek"
    - Novell DOS 7, a single-user, multi-tasking system derived from DR DOS
    - Caldera OpenDOS 7.01
    - Caldera DR-DOS 7.02 and higher

=== Digital Equipment Corporation, Compaq, Hewlett-Packard, Hewlett Packard Enterprise ===
- Batch-11/DOS-11
- OS/8
- RSTS/E – multi-user time-sharing OS for PDP-11s
- RSX-11 – multiuser, multitasking OS for PDP-11s
- RT-11 – single user OS for PDP-11
- TOPS-10 – for the PDP-10
- TENEX – an ancestor of TOPS-20 from BBN, for the PDP-10
- TOPS-20 – for the PDP-10
- DEC MICA – for the DEC PRISM
- Digital UNIX – derived from OSF/1, became HP's Tru64 UNIX
- Ultrix
- VMS – originally by DEC (now by VMS Software Inc.) for the VAX mini-computer range; later renamed OpenVMS and ported to Alpha, and subsequently ported to Intel Itanium and then to x86-64
- WAITS – for the PDP-6 and PDP-10

=== ENEA AB ===
- OSE – Flexible, small footprint, high-performance RTOS for control processors

=== Fujitsu ===
- Towns OS
- XSP
- OS/IV
- MSP
- MSP-EX

=== GEC Computers ===
- COS
- DOS
- OS4000

=== General Electric, Honeywell, Bull ===
- Real-Time Multiprogramming Operating System
- GCOS
- Multics

=== Google ===
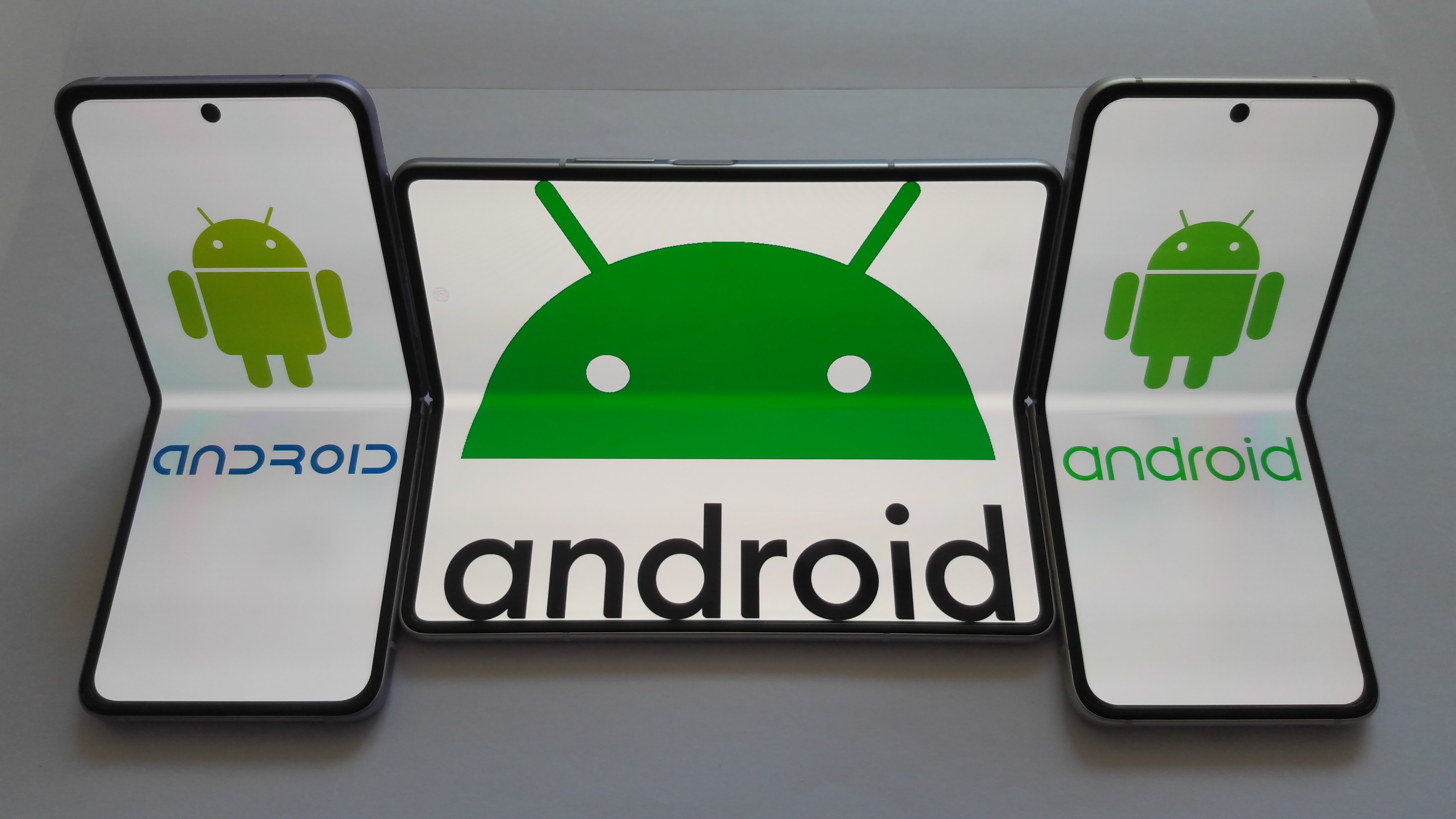
Android OS on the Samsung Galaxy Z smartphones

- ChromiumOS is an open source operating system development version of ChromeOS. Both operating systems are based on the Linux kernel.
  - ChromeOS is designed to work exclusively with web applications, though has been updated to run Android apps with full support for Google Play Store. Announced on July 7, 2009, ChromeOS is currently publicly available and was released summer 2011. The ChromeOS source code was released on November 19, 2009, under the BSD license as ChromiumOS.
  - Container-Optimized OS (COS) is an operating system that is optimized for running Docker containers, based on ChromiumOS.
- Android is an operating system for mobile devices. It consists of Android Runtime (userland) with Linux (kernel), with its Linux kernel modified to add drivers for mobile device hardware and to remove unused Vanilla Linux drivers.
  - Android TV
- gLinux, a Linux distribution that Google uses internally
- Fuchsia is a capability-based real-time operating system (RTOS) scalable to universal devices, in early development, from the tiniest embedded hardware, wristwatches, tablets to the largest personal computers. Unlike ChromeOS and Android, it is not based on the Linux kernel, but instead began on a new microkernel called "Zircon", derived from "Little Kernel".
- Wear OS a version of Google's Android operating system designed for smartwatches and other wearables.
- GooglebookOS (ALOS)

=== Green Hills Software ===
- INTEGRITY – Reliable Operating system
- INTEGRITY-178B – A DO-178B certified version of INTEGRITY.
- μ-velOSity – A lightweight microkernel.

=== Harris Computer Systems ===
- Vulcan O/S – Proprietary O/S for Harris Computer Systems (HCX)
- CX/UX – Proprietary UNIX based OS for Harris' computers (MCX)

=== Heathkit, Zenith Data Systems ===
- HDOS – ran on the H8 and Heath/Zenith Z-89 series
- HT-11 – a modified version of RT-11 that ran on the Heathkit H11

=== Hewlett-Packard, Hewlett Packard Enterprise ===
- HP Multi-Programming Executive (MPE, MPE/XL, and MPE/iX) – runs on HP 3000 and HP e3000 mini-computers
- HP-UX – runs on HP9000 and Itanium servers (from small to mainframe-class computers)

=== Honeywell ===
- CP-6, CP-V work-alike for Honeywell Level/66

=== Huawei ===
- HarmonyOS
- HarmonyOS NEXT
- LiteOS
- EulerOS

=== Intel Corporation ===
- iRMX – real-time operating system originally created to support the Intel 8080 and 8086 processor families in embedded applications.
- ISIS, ISIS-II – "Intel Systems Implementation Supervisor" was an environment for development of software within the Intel microprocessor family in the early 1980s on their Intellec Microcomputer Development System and clones. ISIS-II worked with 8 inch floppy disks and had an editor, cross-assemblers, a linker, an object locator, debugger, compilers for PL/M, a BASIC interpreter, etc. and allowed file management through a console.
- iMAX 432 - an operating system for systems based on Intel's iAPX 432 architecture.

=== IBM ===
==== On early mainframes: 1410, 7010, 704, 709, 7090, 7094, 7040, 7044, 7030 ====
- BESYS – for the IBM 7090
- Compatible Time-Sharing System (CTSS) – developed at MIT's Computation Center for use on a modified IBM 7094
- FORTRAN Monitor System (FMS) – for the IBM 709 and 7090
- GM OS & GM-NAA I/O – for the IBM 704
- IBSYS – tape based operating system for IBM 7090 and IBM 7094
- 7040/7044 Operating System (16/32K) - 7040-PR-150
- IJMON – A bootable serial I/O monitor for loading programs for the IBM 1400 series
- 1410 Processor Operating System (PR-155) for the 1410 and 7010
- SHARE Operating System (SOS) – for the IBM 704 and 709
- University of Michigan Executive System (UMES) – for the IBM 704, 709, and 7090)

==== On S/360, S/370, and successor mainframes ====
- OS/360 and successors on IBM S/360, S/370, and successor mainframes
  - OS/360 (first official OS targeted for the System/360 architecture)
    - PCP (Primary Control Program, a kernel and a ground breaking automatic space allocating file system)
    - MFT (original Multi-programming with a Fixed number of Tasks, replaced by MFT II)
    - MFT II (Multi-Programming with a Fixed number of Tasks, had up to 15 fixed size application partitions, plus partitions for system tasks, initially defined at boot time but redefinable by operator command)
    - MVT (Multi-Programming with a Variable number of Tasks, had up to 15 application regions defined dynamically, plus additional regions for system tasks)
    - M65MP (MVT with support for a multiprocessor 360/65)
  - OS/VS (port of OS/360 targeted for the System/370 virtual memory architecture (OS/370 is not the correct name for OS/VS1 and OS/VS2.) OS/VS has the following variations:
    - OS/VS1 (Operating System/Virtual Storage 1, Virtual-memory version of OS/360 MFT II)
      - OS/VS1 Basic Programming Extensions (BPE) adds device support and VM handshaking
    - OS/VS2 (Operating System/Virtual Storage 2, Virtual-memory version of OS/360 MVT)
      - OS/VS2 R1 (Called Single Virtual Storage (SVS), Virtual-memory version of OS/360 MVT but without multiprocessing support)
      - OS/VS2 R2 through R3.8 (called Multiple Virtual Storage, MVS, eliminated most need for VS1).
        - MVS/SE (MVS System Extensions)
  - MVS/SP (MVS System Product) V1
  - MVS/370 refers to OS/VS2 MVS, MVS/SE and MVS/SP Version 1
  - MVS/XA (MVS/SP V2, supports S/370 Extended Architecture, 31-bit addressing)
  - MVS/ESA (MVS supported Enterprise Systems Architecture, horizontal addressing extensions: data only address spaces called Dataspaces)
    - MVS/SP V3
    - MVS/ESA SP V4 (a Unix environment was available for MVS/ESA SP V4R3)
    - MVS/ESA SP V5 (the UNIX environment was bundled in this and all subsequent versions)
  - OS/390 replacement for MVS/ESA SP V5 with some products bundled
  - z/OS z/Architecture replacement for OS/390 with 64-bit virtual addressing
  - Phoenix/MVS (Developed at Cambridge University)
- DOS/360 and successors on IBM S/360, S/370, and successor mainframes
  - BOS/360 (early interim version of DOS/360, briefly available at a few Alpha & Beta System/360 sites)
  - TOS/360 (similar to BOS above and more fleeting, able to boot and run from 2x00 series tape drives)
  - DOS/360 (Disk Operating System (DOS), multi-programming system with up to 3 partitions, first commonly available OS for System/360)
    - DOS/360/RJE (DOS/360 with a control program extension that provided for the monitoring of remote job entry hardware (card reader & printer) connected by dedicated phone lines)
  - DOS/VS (First DOS offered on System/370 systems, provided virtual storage)
  - DOS/VSE (also known as VSE, upgrade of DOS/VS, up to 14 fixed size processing partitions )
    - VSE/Advanced Functions (VSE/AF) - Additional functionality for DOS/VSE
  - VSE/SP (program product including DOS/VSE and VSE/AF)
  - VSE/ESA, replaces VSE/SP, supports ESA/370 and ESA/390 with 31-bit addresses
  - z/VSE (latest version of the four decades old DOS lineage, supports 64-bit addresses, multiprocessing, multiprogramming, SNA, TCP/IP, and some virtual machine features in support of Linux workloads)
- CP/CMS (Control Program/Cambridge Monitor System) and successors on IBM S/360, S/370, and successor mainframes
  - CP-40/CMS (for System/360 Model 40)
  - CP-67/CMS (for System/360 Model 67)
  - Virtual Machine Facility/370 (VM/370) - the CP virtual machine hypervisor, Conversational Monitor System (CMS) operating system and supporting facilities for System/370 (24-bit addresses)
    - VM/370 Basic System Extensions Program Product (VM/BSE, AKA BSEPP) is an enhancement to VM/370
    - VM/370 System Extensions Program Product (VM/SE, AKA SEPP) is an enhancement to VM/370 that includes the facilities of VM/BSE
  - Virtual Machine/System Product (VM/SP) replaces VM/370, VM/BSE and VM/SE.
  - Virtual Machine/Extended Architecture (VM/XA) refers to three versions of VM that support System/370 Extended Architecture (S/370-XA) with 31-bit virtual addresses
    - Virtual Machine/Extended architecture Migration Aid (VM/XA MA) - Intended for MVS/370 to MVS/XA migration
    - Virtual Machine/Extended Architecture Systems Facility (VM/XA SF) - new release of VM/XA MA with additional functionality
    - Virtual Machine/Extended Architecture System Product (VM/XA SP) - Replaces VM/SP, VM/SP HPO and VM/XA SF
  - Virtual Machine/Enterprise Systems Architecture (VM/ESA), supports S/370, ESA/370 and ESA/390 (a Unix environment was available starting with Version 2.)
  - z/VM (z/Architecture version of the VM OS with 64-bit addressing). Starting with Version 3, the Unix environment was standard.
- TPF Line (Transaction Processing Facility) on IBM S/360, S/370, and successor mainframes (largely used by airlines)
  - ACP (Airline Control Program)
  - TPF (Transaction Processing Facility)
  - z/TPF (z/Architecture extension)
- Unix-like on IBM S/360, S/370, and successor mainframes
  - VM/IX PRPQ (IBM's Interactive eXecutive, a System III Unix version)
  - IX/370 (IBM's Interactive eXecutive, a System V Unix version)
  - AIX/370 (IBM's Advanced Interactive eXecutive, a System V Unix version)
  - AIX/ESA (IBM's Advanced Interactive eXecutive, a System V Unix version)
  - OpenSolaris for System z
  - UTS (developed by Amdahl)
  - Linux on IBM Z
- Others on IBM S/360, S/370, and successor mainframes:
  - BOS/360 (Basic Operating System)
  - Distributed Processing Programming Executive/370 (DPPX/370) a port of DDPX from 8100 to S/370.
  - MTS (Michigan Terminal System, developed by a group of universities in the US, Canada, and the UK for the IBM System/360 Model 67, System/370 series, and compatible mainframes)
  - RTOS/360 (IBM's Real Time Operating System, ran on 5 NASA custom System/360-75s)
  - TOS/360 (Tape Operating System)
  - TSS/360 (IBM's Time Sharing System)
  - TSS/370 PRPQ (IBM's Time Sharing System ported to S/370)
  - MUSIC/SP (developed by McGill University for IBM System/370)
  - ORVYL and WYLBUR (developed by Stanford University for IBM System/360)

==== On PC and Intel x86 based architectures ====
- PC DOS, IBM DOS
  - PC DOS 1.x, 2.x, 3.x (developed jointly with Microsoft)
  - IBM DOS 4.x, 5.0 (developed jointly with Microsoft)
  - PC DOS 6.1, 6.3, 7, 2000, 7.10
- OS/2
  - OS/2 1.x (developed jointly with Microsoft)
  - OS/2 2.x
  - OS/2 Warp 3 (ported to PPC via Workplace OS)
  - OS/2 Warp 4
  - eComStation (Warp 4.5/Workspace on Demand, rebundled by Serenity Systems International)
  - ArcaOS (Warp 4.52 based system sold by Arca Noae, LLC)
- IBM 4680 OS version 1 to 4, a POS operating system based on Digital Research's Concurrent DOS 286 and FlexOS 286 1.xx
  - IBM 4690 OS version 1 to 6.3, a successor to 4680 OS based on Novell's FlexOS 286/FlexOS 386 2.3x
    - Toshiba 4690 OS version 6.4, a successor to 4690 OS 6.3
- Unix-like on PS/2
  - AIX (IBM's Advanced Interactive eXecutive, a System V Unix version)

==== On other hardware platforms ====
- IBM Series/1
  - EDX (Event Driven Executive)
  - RPS (Realtime Programming System)
  - CPS (Control Programming Support, subset of RPS)
  - SerIX (Unix on Series/1)
- IBM 1130
  - DMS (Disk Monitor System)
- IBM 1800
  - TSX (Time Sharing eXecutive)
  - MPX (Multi Programming eXecutive)
- IBM 8100
  - DPCX (Distributed Processing Control eXecutive)
  - DPPX (Distributed Processing Programming Executive)
- IBM System/3
  - DMS (Disk Management System)
- IBM System/34, IBM System/36
  - SSP (System Support Program)
- IBM System/38
  - CPF (Control Program Facility)
- IBM System/88
  - Stratus VOS (developed by Stratus, and used for IBM System/88, Original equipment manufacturer from Stratus)
- IBM AS/400, iSeries, System i, IBM Power Systems
  - IBM i (previously known as OS/400 and i5/OS, descendant of System/38 CPF, includes System/36 SSP and AIX environment)
- UNIX on IBM RT PC
  - AOS (a BSD Unix version, not related to Data General AOS)
  - AIX (Advanced Interactive eXecutive, a System V Unix version)
- UNIX on POWER ISA, PowerPC, and Power ISA
  - AIX (Advanced Interactive eXecutive, a System V Unix version)
- Others
  - Workplace OS (a microkernel based operating system including OS/2, developed and canceled in the 1990s)
  - K42 (open-source research operating system on PowerPC or x86 based cache-coherent multiprocessor systems)
  - Dynix (developed by Sequent, and used for IBM NUMA-Q too)

=== International Computers Limited ===
- J and MultiJob – for the System 4 series mainframes
- GEORGE 2/3/4 GEneral ORGanisational Environment – used by ICL 1900 series mainframes
- Edinburgh Multiple Access System (EMAS) for the ICL System 4/75, from the University of Edinburgh, later ported to other systems.
- Executive – used on the 1900 and 290x range of minicomputers. A modified version of Executive was also used as part of GEORGE 3 and 4.
- TME – used on the ME29 minicomputer
- ICL VME – including early variants VME/B and VME/2900, appearing on the ICL 2900 Series and Series 39 mainframes, implemented in S3
- VME/K – on early smaller 2900s

=== Jide ===
- Remix OS

=== Jolla ===
- Sailfish OS

=== KaiOS ===
- KaiOS

=== Lynx Real-time Systems, LynuxWorks, Lynx Software Technologies ===
- LynxOS

=== Meizu ===
- Flyme OS

=== Microsoft Corporation ===
- Xenix (licensed version of Unix; licensed to SCO in 1987)
- MS-DOS (developed jointly with IBM, versions 1.0–6.22)
  - Z-DOS
  - MS-Net
  - MS-DOS 4.0 (multitasking)
  - MS-DOS 7
  - MSX-DOS (developed by MS Japan for the MSX 8-bit computer)
  - DOS/V
- OS/2 1.x (developed jointly with IBM until version 1.3)
  - LAN Manager
- Windows (16-bit and 32-bit preemptive and cooperative multitasking, running atop MS-DOS)
  - Windows 1.0 (Windows 1)
  - Windows 2.0 (Windows 2 – separate version for i386 processor)
  - Windows 2.1 (Windows/286, Windows/386)
  - Windows 3.0 (Windows 3)
  - Windows 3.1x (Windows 3.1)
  - Windows for Workgroups 3.1 (Codename Snowball)
  - Windows 3.2 (Chinese-only release)
  - Windows for Workgroups 3.11
  - Windows 95 (codename Chicago – Windows 4.0)
  - Windows 98 (codename Memphis – Windows 4.1)
  - Windows Millennium Edition (Windows ME – Windows 4.9)
- Windows NT (Full 32-bit or 64-bit kernel, not dependent on MS-DOS)
  - Windows NT 3.1
  - Windows NT 3.5
  - Windows NT 3.51
  - Windows NT 4.0
  - Windows 2000 (Windows NT 5.0)
  - Windows XP (Windows NT 5.1)
  - Windows Server 2003 (Windows NT 5.2)
  - Windows Fundamentals for Legacy PCs (based on Windows XP)
  - Windows Vista (Windows NT 6.0)
  - Windows Azure (Cloud OS Platform) 2009
  - Windows Home Server (based on Windows Server 2003)
  - Windows Server 2008 (based on Windows Vista)
  - Windows 7 (Windows NT 6.1)
  - Windows Server 2008 R2 (based on Windows 7)
  - Windows Home Server 2011 (based on Windows Server 2008 R2)
  - Windows 8 (Windows NT 6.2)
  - Windows RT
  - Windows Phone 8
  - Windows Server 2012 (based on Windows 8)
  - Windows 8.1 (Windows NT 6.3)
  - Windows Phone 8.1
  - Windows Server 2012 R2 (based on Windows 8.1)
  - Windows 10 (Windows NT 10.0)
  - Windows 10 Mobile
  - Windows Server 2016
  - Windows Server 2019
  - Windows 11 (Windows NT 10.0)
  - Windows Server 2022
  - Windows Server 2025
- Windows CE (OS for handhelds, embedded devices, and real-time applications that is similar to other versions of Windows)
  - Windows CE 3.0
  - Windows CE 5.0
  - Windows Embedded CE 6.0
  - Windows Embedded Compact 7
  - Windows Embedded Compact 2013
  - Windows Mobile (based on Windows CE, but for a smaller form factor)
  - Windows Phone 7
  - KIN OS
- Xbox system software
  - Xbox (first generation) system software
  - Xbox 360 system software
  - Xbox One system software
  - Xbox Series X/S system software
- Singularity – A research operating system written mostly in managed code (C#)
- Midori – A managed code operating system
- SONiC
- Azure Sphere
- CBL-Mariner

=== MITS ===
- Altair DOS – An early disk operating system for the Altair 8800 machine.

=== MontaVista ===
- MontaVista Mobilinux

=== Motorola ===
- VERSAdos

=== NCR Corporation ===
- TMX – Transaction Management eXecutive.
- IMOS – Interactive Multiprogramming Operating System (circa 1978), for the NCR Century 8200 series minicomputers.
- VRX – Virtual Resource eXecutive.

=== NeXT ===
- NeXTSTEP

=== Nintendo ===
- ES – a computer operating system developed originally by Nintendo and since 2008 by Esrille. It is open source and runs natively on x86 platforms.
- Nintendo DSi system software
- Wii system software
- Nintendo 3DS system software
- Wii U system software
- Nintendo Switch system software

=== Novell ===
- NetWare – network operating system providing high-performance network services. Has been superseded by Open Enterprise Server line, which can be based on NetWare or Linux to provide the same set of services.
- UnixWare
  - Novell "SuperNOS" – a never released merge of NetWare and UnixWare
- Novell "Corsair"
  - Novell "Exposé"
- Open Enterprise Server – the successor to NetWare

=== Open Mobile Platform ===
- Aurora OS – the successor to Sailfish OS (not to be confused with a different Aurora OS)

=== Quadros Systems ===
- RTXC Quadros RTOS – proprietary C-based RTOS used in embedded systems

=== RCA ===
- Time Sharing Operating System (TSOS) – first OS supporting virtual addressing of the main storage and support for both timeshare and batch interface

=== RoweBots ===
- DSPnano RTOS – 8/16 Bit Ultra Tiny Embedded Linux Compatible RTOS

=== Samsung Electronics ===
- Bada
- Tizen is an operating system based on the Linux kernel, a project within the Linux Foundation and is governed by a Technical Steering Group (TSG) while controlled by Samsung and backed by Intel. Tizen works on a wide range of Samsung devices including smartphones, tablets, smart TVs, PCs and wearable.
- Orsay
- One UI - Android custom ROM

=== Scientific Data Systems (SDS) ===
==== SDS 900 series ====
- Berkeley Timesharing System for the SDS 940

==== SDS Sigma series ====
- Universal Time-Sharing System CP-V, CP-R
- Xerox Operating System (XOS)
- GORDO from UCLA
- Ésope (operating system) from IRIA for the Sigma 7 and CII 10070

=== SCO, SCO Group ===
- Xenix, Unix System III based distribution for the Intel 8086/8088 architecture
  - Xenix 286, Unix System V Release 2 based distribution for the Intel 80286 architecture
  - Xenix 386, Unix System V Release 2 based distribution for the Intel 80386 architecture
- SCO Unix, SCO UNIX System V/386 was the first volume commercial product licensed by AT&T to use the UNIX System trademark (1989). Derived from AT&T System V Release 3.2 with an infusion of Xenix device drivers and utilities plus most of the SVR4 features
  - SCO Open Desktop, the first 32-bit graphical user interface for UNIX Systems running on Intel processor-based computers. Based on SCO Unix
- SCO OpenServer 5, AT&T UNIX System V Release 3 based
- SCO OpenServer 6, SVR5 (UnixWare 7) based kernel with SCO OpenServer 5 application and binary compatibility, system administration, and user environments
- UnixWare
  - UnixWare 2.x, based on AT&T System V Release 4.2MP
  - UnixWare 7, UnixWare 2 kernel plus parts of 3.2v5 (UnixWare 2 + OpenServer 5 = UnixWare 7). Referred to by SCO as SVR5

=== Silicon Laboratories (formerly Micrium Inc.) ===
- Micrium OS - customized μC/OS-III for Silicon Laboratories's SoC products

=== Sinclair Research ===
- Sinclair BASIC was used in the 8-bit home computers from Sinclair Research and Timex Sinclair. It was included in the ROM, and the computers booted to the Basic interpreter. Various versions exist, with the latter ones supporting disk drive operations.

=== Sony ===
- PlayStation Vita system software
- PlayStation 3 system software
- PlayStation 4 system software
- PlayStation 5 system software

=== SYSGO ===
- PikeOS – a certified real time operating system for safety and security critical embedded systems

=== Tandem Computers, Compaq, Hewlett-Packard, Hewlett Packard Enterprise ===
- NonStop OS - formerly Guardian (Tandem), then NonStop Kernel, then NonStop OS; runs on HPE's NonStop line of servers

=== Tandy Corporation ===
- TRSDOS – A floppy-disk-oriented OS supplied by Tandy/Radio Shack for their TRS-80 Z80-based line of personal computers. Eventually renamed as LS-DOS or LDOS.
- Color BASIC – A ROM-based OS created by Microsoft for the TRS-80 Color Computer.
- NewDos/80 – A third-party OS for Tandy's TRS-80 personal computers.
- DeskMate – Operating system created by Tandy Corporation and introduced with the Tandy 1000 computer.

=== TCSC (later NCSC) ===
- Edos – enhanced version of IBM's DOS/360 (and later DOS/VS and DOS/VSE) operating system for System/360 and System/370 IBM mainframes

=== Texas Instruments ===
- TI-RTOS Kernel – Real-time operating system for TI's embedded devices.

=== TRON Project ===
- TRON – open real-time operating system kernel
- T-Kernel

=== UNIVAC, Unisys ===
- EXEC I
- EXEC II
- EXEC 8/OS 1100/OS 2200
- VS/9, successor to RCA TSOS
- OS/4 for 9000 series

=== Valve ===
- SteamOS 1.0 & 2.0 - a Debian-based operating system for Steam Machine and x86-64PCs
- SteamOS 3.0 - an Arch Linux-based operating system for Handheld gaming PCs

=== Wang Laboratories ===
- WPS Wang Word Processing System. Micro-code based system.
- OIS Wang Office Information System. Successor to the WPS. Combined the WPS and VP/MVP systems.

=== Weston Embedded Solutions ===
- μC/OS-II – a small pre-emptive priority based multi-tasking kernel
- μC/OS-III – a small pre-emptive priority based multi-tasking kernel, with unlimited number of tasks and priorities, and round-robin scheduling
- Cesium RTOS - commercial continuation of Micrium's μC/OS-III forked from the open-sources release

=== Wind River Systems ===
- VxWorks – Small footprint, scalable, high-performance RTOS for embedded microprocessor based systems.

=== Zilog ===
- Z80-RIO

=== Other ===
==== Lisp-based ====
- Lisp Machines, Inc. (also known as LMI) used an operating system written in MIT's Lisp Machine Lisp.
- Symbolics Genera written in a systems dialect of the Lisp programming language called ZetaLisp and Symbolics Common Lisp. Genera was ported to a virtual machine for the DEC Alpha line of computers.
- Texas Instruments' Explorer Lisp machine workstations also had systems code written in Lisp Machine Lisp.
- Xerox 1100 series of Lisp machines used an operating system also written in Interlisp, and was also ported to a virtual machine called "Medley."

==== For Elektronika BK ====
- ANDOS
- CSI-DOS
- MK-DOS

==== Non-standard language-based ====
- Pilot operating system – written in the Mesa language and used on Xerox Star workstations.
- PERQ Operating System (POS) – written in PERQ Pascal.

==== Other proprietary non-Unix-like ====
- Operating system for Эльбрус-1 (Elbrus-1) and Эльбрус-2 – used for application, job control, system programming, implemented in uЭль-76 (AL-76).
- Business Operating System (BOS) – developed to be ported across microcomputers.
- EOS – developed by ETA Systems for use in their ETA-10 line of supercomputers
- EMBOS – developed by Elxsi for use on their mini-supercomputers
- GCOS – a proprietary operating system originally developed by General Electric
- MAI Basic Four – An OS implementing Business Basic from MAI Systems.
- Michigan Terminal System – Developed by a group of universities in the US, Canada, and the UK for use on the IBM System/360 Model 67, the System/370 series, and compatible mainframes
- MUSIC/SP – an operating system developed for the S/370, running normally under VM
- OS ES – an operating system for ES EVM
- PC-MOS/386 – DOS-like, but multiuser/multitasking
- Prolog-Dispatcher – used to control Soviet Buran space shuttle.
- SINTRAN III – an operating system used with Norsk Data computers.
- SkyOS – commercial desktop OS for PCs
- SODA – used by the Odra 1204 computers.
- THEOS
- TSX-32 – a 32-bit operating system for x86 platform.
- TX990/TXDS, DX10 and DNOS – proprietary operating systems for TI-990 minicomputers

==== Other proprietary Unix-like and POSIX-compliant ====
- Aegis (Apollo Computer)
- Amiga Unix (Amiga ports of Unix System V release 3.2 with Amiga A2500UX and SVR4 with Amiga A3000UX. Started in 1990, last version was in 1992)
- ChorusOS from INRIA
- Coherent (Unix-like OS from Mark Williams Co. for PC class computers)
- DC/OSx (DataCenter/OSx—an operating system developed by Pyramid Technology for its MIPS-based systems)
- DG/UX (Data General Corp)
- DNIX from DIAB
- DSPnano RTOS (POSIX nanokernel, DSP Optimized, Open Source)
- HeliOS developed and sold by Perihelion Software mainly for transputer-based systems
- Interactive Unix (a port of the UNIX System V operating system for Intel x86 by Interactive Systems Corporation)
- IRIX from SGI
- MASIX from MASI laboratory (a multiserver operating system based on Mach microkernel)
- MeikOS
- NeXTSTEP (developed by NeXT; a Unix-based OS based on the Mach microkernel)
- OS-9 Unix-like RTOS. (OS from Microware for Motorola 6809 based microcomputers)
- OS9/68K Unix-like RTOS. (OS from Microware for Motorola 680x0 based microcomputers; based on OS-9)
- OS-9000 Unix-like RTOS. (OS from Microware for Intel x86 based microcomputers; based on OS-9, written in C)
- OSF/1 (developed into a commercial offering by Digital Equipment Corporation)
- OPENSTEP
- QNX (POSIX, microkernel OS; usually a real time embedded OS)
- PNX, a port of UNIX v7 and System III to the PERQ computer
- Rhapsody (an early form of Mac OS X)
- RISC iX – derived from BSD 4.3, by Acorn computers, for their ARM family of machines
- RISC/os (a port by MIPS Technologies of 4.3BSD for its MIPS-based computers)
- RMX
- SCO UNIX (from SCO, bought by Caldera who renamed themselves SCO Group)
- SINIX (a port by SNI of Unix to the MIPS architecture)
- Solaris (from Sun, bought by Oracle; a System V-based replacement for SunOS)
- SunOS (BSD-based Unix system used on early Sun hardware)
- SUPER-UX (a port of System V Release 4.2MP with features adopted from BSD and Linux for NEC SX architecture supercomputers)
- System V (a release of AT&T Unix, 'SVR4' was the 4th minor release)
- System V/AT, 386 (The first version of AT&T System V UNIX on the IBM 286 and 386 PCs, ported and sold by Microport)
- Trusted Solaris (Solaris with kernel and other enhancements to support multilevel security)
- UniFLEX (Unix-like OS from TSC for DMA-capable, extended addresses, Motorola 6809 based computers; e.g. SWTPC, Gimix and others)
- Unicos (the version of Unix designed for Cray Supercomputers, mainly geared to vector calculations)
- UTX-32 (Developed by Gould CSD (Computer System Division), a Unix-based OS that included both BSD and System V characteristics. It was one of the first Unix based systems to receive NSA's C2 security level certification.)
- Zenix, Zenith corporations Unix (a popular USA electronics maker at the time)

== Non-proprietary ==
=== Unix or Unix-like ===
- MINIX (study OS developed by Andrew S. Tanenbaum in the Netherlands)
- Berkeley Software Distribution (BSD), a variant of Unix originally for DEC PDP-11 and VAX hardware)
  - FreeBSD (one of the outgrowths of UC Regents' abandonment of CSRG's 'BSD Unix')
    - DragonFly BSD, forked from FreeBSD 4.8
    - MidnightBSD, forked from FreeBSD 6.1
    - GhostBSD
    - TrueOS (previously known as PC-BSD), made for desktop/laptop usage, now discontinued
    - NomadBSD, a project aiming to tend FreeBSD to desktop/laptop needs
  - NetBSD (an embedded device BSD variant)
    - OpenBSD forked from NetBSD
      - Bitrig forked from OpenBSD, discontinued
      - FuguIta, a live OpenBSD fork by a Japanese developer
  - Darwin, created by Apple using code from NeXTSTEP, FreeBSD, and NetBSD
- GNU (also known as GNU/Hurd)
- Linux (see also List of Linux distributions) (alleged to be GNU/Linux see GNU/Linux naming controversy)
  - Android
    - Android-x86
      - Remix OS
    - EulerOS - Linux commercial distribution for cloud based software by Huawei
      - openEuler - open-source community version of EulerOS
      - NestOS - open-source cloud based operating system based on EulerOS, contributed by openEuler community
- NuttX - a Unix/Linux-like RTOS for Microcontrollers) (written in C)
- Redox (written in Rust)
- OpenSolaris
  - illumos, contains original Unix (SVR4) code derived from the OpenSolaris (discontinued by Oracle in favor of Solaris 11 Express)
    - OpenIndiana, operates under the illumos Foundation. Uses the illumos kernel, which is a derivative of OS/Net, which is basically an OpenSolaris/Solaris kernel with the bulk of the drivers, core libraries, and basic utilities.
    - Nexenta OS, based on the illumos kernel with Ubuntu packages
    - SmartOS, an illumos distribution for cloud computing with Kernel-based Virtual Machine integration.
- RTEMS (Real-Time Executive for Multiprocessor Systems)
- Syllable Desktop
- VSTa
- Plurix (or Tropix) (by Federal University of Rio de Janeiro – UFRJ)
- TUNIS (University of Toronto)
- Xv6 - a simple Unix-like teaching operating system from MIT
- SerenityOS - aims to be a modern Unix-like operating system, yet with a look and feel that emulates 1990s operating systems such as Microsoft Windows and the classic Mac OS.

=== Non-Unix ===
- Cosmos – written in C#
- EmuTOS - open source Atari TOS variant
- FreeDOS – open source MS-DOS variant
- Genode – operating system framework for microkernels (written in C++)
- Google Fuchsia
- Haiku – open source inspired by BeOS, in development
- Incompatible Timesharing System (ITS) – written in the MIDAS macro assembler language for the PDP-6 and PDP-10 by MIT students
- LiteOS
- MagiC - open source Atari TOS variant
- MiNT - alternative operating system for the Atari ST
- OpenHarmony - LiteOS kernel and kernel add-ons side of the kernel tree under Kernel Abstract Layer (KAL) structure
- Uniproton real-time operating system for ultra-low latency and adaptable mixed-critical deployment capabilities contributed by openEuler community and also part of OpenHarmony add-on kernel
- osFree – OS/2 Warp open source clone
- OSv – written in C++
- Phantom OS – persistent object-oriented
- ReactOS – open source OS designed to be binary compatible with Windows NT and its variants (Windows XP, Windows 2000, etc.); in development
- [Redacted] OS - open source made by Developed from Scratch
- SharpOS – written in .NET C#
- Visopsys – written in C and assembly by Andy McLaughlin
- Quantix

== Research ==
=== Unix or Unix-like ===
- Plan 9 from Bell Labs – distributed OS developed at Bell Labs, based on original Unix design principles yet functionally different and going much further
  - Inferno – distributed OS derived from Plan 9, originally from Bell Labs
  - 9front, a derivative open-source project made to resurrect Plan 9 to passionate developers
- Research Unix
- Sprite from U.C Berkeley

=== Non-Unix ===
- Accent - the precursor of CMU Mach, for the PERQ computer
- Amoeba – research OS by Andrew S. Tanenbaum
- Barrelfish
- Croquet
- EROS – microkernel, capability-based
- Harmony – realtime, multitasking, multiprocessing message-passing system developed at the National Research Council of Canada.
- HelenOS – research and experimental operating system
- ILIOS – Research OS designed for routing
- L4 – second generation microkernel
- Mach – from OS kernel research at Carnegie Mellon University; see NeXTSTEP
- Nemesis – Cambridge University research OS – detailed quality of service abilities
- Singularity – experimental OS from Microsoft Research written in managed code to be highly dependable
- Spring – research OS from Sun Microsystems
- THE multiprogramming system – by Dijkstra in 1968, at the Eindhoven University of Technology in the Netherlands, introduced the first form of software-based memory segmentation, freeing programmers from being forced to use actual physical locations
- Thoth – realtime, multiprocess message-passing system developed at the University of Waterloo.
- Tock
- V – from Stanford, early 1980s
- Verve – OS designed by Microsoft Research to be verified end-to-end for type safety and memory safety
- Xinu – Study OS developed by Douglas E. Comer in the United States

== Disk operating systems (DOS) ==
- 86-DOS (developed at Seattle Computer Products by Tim Paterson for the new Intel 808x CPUs; licensed to Microsoft, became PC DOS/MS-DOS. Also known by its working title QDOS.)
  - PC DOS (IBM's DOS variant, developed jointly with Microsoft, versions 1.0–7.0, 2000, 7.10)
  - MS-DOS (Microsoft's DOS variant for OEM, developed jointly with IBM, versions 1.x–6.22 Microsoft's now abandoned DOS variant)
- Concurrent CP/M-86 3.1 (BDOS 3.1) with PC-MODE (Digital Research's successor of CP/M-86 and MP/M-86)
  - Concurrent DOS 3.1-4.1 (BDOS 3.1-4.1)
    - Concurrent PC DOS 3.2 (BDOS 3.2) (Concurrent DOS variant for IBM compatible PCs)
      - DOS Plus 1.1, 1.2 (BDOS 4.1), 2.1 (BDOS 5.0) (single-user, multi-tasking system derived from Concurrent DOS 4.1-5.0)
    - Concurrent DOS 8-16 (dual-processor variant of Concurrent DOS for 8086 and 8080 CPUs)
    - Concurrent DOS 286 1.x
      - FlexOS 1.00-2.34 (derivative of Concurrent DOS 286)
        - FlexOS 186 (variant of FlexOS for terminals)
        - FlexOS 286 (variant of FlexOS for hosts)
          - Siemens S5-DOS/MT (industrial control system based on FlexOS)
          - IBM 4680 OS (POS operating system based on FlexOS)
          - IBM 4690 OS (POS operating system based on FlexOS)
            - Toshiba 4690 OS (POS operating system based on IBM 4690 OS and FlexOS)
        - FlexOS 386 (later variant of FlexOS for hosts)
          - IBM 4690 OS (POS operating system based on FlexOS)
            - Toshiba 4690 OS (POS operating system based on IBM 4690 OS and FlexOS)
    - Concurrent DOS 386 1.0, 1.1, 2.0, 3.0 (BDOS 5.0-6.2)
      - Concurrent DOS 386/MGE (Concurrent DOS 386 variant with advanced graphics terminal capabilities)
      - Multiuser DOS 5.0, 5.01, 5.1 (BDOS 6.3-6.6) (successor of Concurrent DOS 386)
        - CCI Multiuser DOS 5.0-7.22 (up to BDOS 6.6)
        - Datapac Multiuser DOS
          - Datapac System Manager 7 (derivative of Datapac Multiuser DOS)
        - IMS Multiuser DOS 5.1, 7.0, 7.1 (BDOS 6.6-6.7)
          - IMS REAL/32 7.50, 7.51, 7.52, 7.53, 7.54, 7.60, 7.61, 7.62, 7.63, 7.70, 7.71, 7.72, 7.73, 7.74, 7.80, 7.81, 7.82, 7.83, 7.90, 7.91, 7.92, 7.93, 7.94, 7.95 (BDOS 6.8 and higher) (derivative of Multiuser DOS)
            - IMS REAL/NG (successor of REAL/32)
    - Concurrent DOS XM 5.0, 5.2, 6.0, 6.2 (BDOS 5.0-6.2) (real-mode variant of Concurrent DOS with EEMS support)
      - DR-DOS 3.31, 3.32, 3.33, 3.34, 3.35, 5.0, 6.0 (BDOS 6.0-7.1) single-user, single-tasking native DOS derived from Concurrent DOS 6.0)
        - Novell PalmDOS 1 (BDOS 7.0)
        - Novell DR DOS "StarTrek"
        - Novell DOS 7 (single-user, multi-tasking system derived from DR DOS, BDOS 7.2)
          - Novell DOS 7 updates 1-10 (BDOS 7.2)
            - Caldera OpenDOS 7.01 (BDOS 7.2)
              - Enhanced DR-DOS 7.01.0x (BDOS 7.2)
                - Dell Real Mode Kernel (DRMK)
          - Novell DOS 7 updates 11–15.2 (BDOS 7.2)
            - Caldera DR-DOS 7.02-7.03 (BDOS 7.3)
              - DR-DOS "WinBolt"
              - OEM DR-DOS 7.04-7.05 (BDOS 7.3)
              - OEM DR-DOS 7.06 (PQDOS)
              - OEM DR-DOS 7.07 (BDOS 7.4/7.7)
- FreeDOS (open source DOS variant)
- ProDOS (operating system for the Apple II series computers)
- PTS-DOS (MS-DOS variant by Russian company Phystechsoft)
- TurboDOS (Software 2000, Inc.) for Z80 and Intel 8086 processor-based systems
- Multi-tasking user interfaces and environments for MS-DOS compatible operating systems
  - DESQview + QEMM 386 multi-tasking user interface
  - DESQView/X (X-windowing GUI

== Network operating systems ==
- Banyan VINES – by Banyan Systems
- Cambridge Ring
- Cisco IOS – by Cisco Systems
- Cisco NX-OS – previously SAN-OS
- CTOS – by Convergent Technologies, later acquired by Unisys
- Data ONTAP – by NetApp
- ExtremeWare – by Extreme Networks
- ExtremeXOS – by Extreme Networks
- Fabric OS – by Brocade
- JunOS – by Juniper
- NetWare – networking OS by Novell
- Network operating system (NOS) – developed by CDC for use in their Cyber line of supercomputers
- Novell Open Enterprise Server – Open Source networking OS by Novell. Can incorporate either SUSE Linux or Novell NetWare as its kernel
- Plan 9 – distributed OS developed at Bell Labs, based on Unix design principles but not functionally identical
  - Inferno – distributed OS derived from Plan 9, originally from Bell Labs
- SONiC
- TurboDOS – by Software 2000, Inc.

== Generic, commodity, and other ==
- BLIS/COBOL
- A2 formerly named Active Object System (AOS), and then Bluebottle (a concurrent and active object update to the Oberon operating system)
- BS1000 by Siemens
- BS2000 by Siemens, now BS2000/OSD from Fujitsu Siemens (formerly Siemens Nixdorf Informationssysteme)
- BS3000 by Siemens (rebadging of Fujitsu's MSP operating system)
- Contiki for various, mostly 8-bit systems, including the Apple II, Atari 8-bit computers, and some Commodore machines.
- FLEX9 (by Technical Systems Consultants (TSC) for Motorola 6809 based machines; successor to FLEX, which was for Motorola 6800 CPUs)
- Graphics Environment Manager (GEM) (windowing GUI for CP/M, DOS, and Atari TOS)
- GEOS (popular windowing GUI for PC, Commodore, Apple computers)
- JavaOS
- JNode (Java New Operating System Design Effort), written 99% in Java (native compiled), provides own JVM and JIT compiler. Based on GNU Classpath.
- JX Java operating system that focuses on a flexible and robust operating system architecture developed as an open source system by the University of Erlangen.
- KERNAL (default OS on Commodore 64)
- MERLIN for the Corvus Concept
- MorphOS (Amiga compatible)
- MSP by Fujitsu (successor to OS-IV), now MSP/EX, also known as Extended System Architecture (EXA), for 31-bit mode
- NetWare (networking OS by Novell)
- Oberon (operating system) (developed at ETH-Zürich by Niklaus Wirth et al.) for the Ceres and Chameleon workstation projects
- OSD/XC by Fujitsu-Siemens (BS2000 ported to an emulation on a Sun SPARC platform)
- OS-IV by Fujitsu (based on early versions of IBM's MVS)
- Pick (often licensed and renamed)
- PRIMOS by Prime Computer (sometimes spelled PR1MOS and PR1ME)
- Sinclair QDOS (multitasking for the Sinclair QL computer)
- SSB-DOS (by Technical Systems Consultants (TSC) for Smoke Signal Broadcasting; a variant of FLEX in most respects)
- SymbOS (GUI based multitasking operating system for Z80 computers)
- Symobi (GUI based modern micro-kernel OS for x86, ARM and PowerPC processors, developed by Miray Software; used and developed further at Technical University of Munich)
- TripOS, 1978
- TurboDOS (Software 2000, Inc.)
- UCSD p-System (portable complete programming environment/operating system/virtual machine developed by a long running student project at UCSD; directed by Prof Kenneth Bowles; written in Pascal)
- VOS by Stratus Technologies with strong influence from Multics
- VOS3 by Hitachi for its IBM-compatible mainframes, based on IBM's MVS
- VM2000 by Siemens
- Visi On (first GUI for early PC machines; not commercially successful)
- VPS/VM (IBM based, main operating system at Boston University for over 10 years.)

== Hobby ==
- 539kernel - a simple x86 32-bit educational kernel
- AROS – AROS Research Operating System (formerly known as Amiga Research Operating System)
- AtheOS – branched to become Syllable Desktop
  - Syllable Desktop – a modern, independently originated OS; see AtheOS
- BareMetal
- DSPnano RTOS
- EmuTOS
- EROS – Extremely Reliable Operating System
- HelenOS – based on a preemptible microkernel design
- LSE/OS
- MenuetOS – extremely compact OS with GUI, written entirely in FASM assembly language
  - KolibriOS – a fork of MenuetOS
- MMURTL (Message based MUltitasking Real-Time kerneL, pronounced 'Myrtle')
- osakaOS - An Azumanga daioh inspired 32 bit OS made with a focus on unconventional/ridiculous design choices.
- SerenityOS
- SerpaeOS
- TempleOS – biblical-themed OS, written in HolyC by Terry Davis
- ToaruOS
  - PonyOS
- VapourOS - alternate SteamOS (legacy Debian based versions) installer
- Managarm – A pragmatic microkernel-based OS with fully asynchronous I/O
- AnimOS - An independent 64 bit operating system written from scratch in C and Assembly by Sipocz Adam

== Embedded ==
=== Mobile operating systems ===
- DIP DOS on Atari Portfolio
- Embedded Linux (see also Linux for mobile devices)
  - Android
    - CalyxOS
    - ColorOS
    - DivestOS
    - EMUI
    - Flyme OS
    - GrapheneOS
    - Kali NetHunter
    - LineageOS
    - MIUI
    - One UI
    - Replicant
    - See also List of custom Android distributions
  - Firefox OS
    - KaiOS
  - Ångström distribution
  - Familiar Linux
  - Mæmo based on Debian deployed on Nokia's Nokia 770, N800 and N810 Internet Tablets.
  - OpenZaurus
  - webOS from Palm, Inc., later Hewlett-Packard via acquisition, and most recently at LG Electronics through acquisition from Hewlett-Packard
  - Access Linux Platform
  - bada
  - Openmoko Linux
  - OPhone
  - MeeGo (from merger of Maemo & Moblin)
  - Mobilinux
  - MotoMagx
  - Nura
  - Qt Extended
  - Sailfish OS
  - Tizen (earlier called LiMo Platform)
  - Ubuntu Touch
- Inferno (distributed OS originally from Bell Labs)
- Magic Cap
- MS-DOS on Poqet PC, HP 95LX, HP 100LX, HP 200LX, HP 1000CX, HP OmniGo 700LX
- NetBSD
- Newton OS on Apple MessagePad
- Palm OS from Palm, Inc; now spun off as PalmSource
- PEN/GEOS on HP OmniGo 100 and 120
- PenPoint OS
- Plan 9 from Bell Labs
- PVOS
- Symbian OS
  - EPOC
- Windows CE, from Microsoft
  - Pocket PC from Microsoft, a variant of Windows CE
  - Windows Mobile from Microsoft, a variant of Windows CE
  - Windows Phone 7 from Microsoft
- Windows Phone based on Windows NT
  - Windows Phone 8
  - Windows 10 Mobile
- DSPnano RTOS
- iOS
  - watchOS
  - tvOS
- iPod software
- iPodLinux
- iriver clix OS
- RockBox
- BlackBerry OS
- PEN/GEOS, GEOS-SC, GEOS-SE
- Symbian platform (successor to Symbian OS)
- BlackBerry 10
- HarmonyOS

=== Routers ===
- CatOS – by Cisco Systems
- Cisco IOS – originally Internetwork Operating System by Cisco Systems
- DNOS – by DriveNets
- Inferno – distributed OS originally from Bell Labs
- IOS-XR – by Cisco Systems
- JunOS – by Juniper Networks
- LCOS – by LANCOM Systems
- Linux
  - IPFire
  - OpenWrt
    - DD-WRT
    - LEDE
    - Gargoyle
    - LibreCMC
  - RouterOS - by MikroTik
  - Zeroshell
- FTOS – by Force10 Networks
- FreeBSD
- Huawei VRP (Versatile Routing Platform) that many Huawei devices operate on
- LiteOS
- HarmonyOS
  - OpenHarmony
- EulerOS
  - openEuler
- m0n0wall
- OPNsense
- pfsense
- List of wireless router firmware projects
- HyperOS

=== Other embedded ===
- Apache Mynewt
- ChibiOS/RT
- Contiki
- CoRTOS "World's simplest embedded RTOS"
- ERIKA Enterprise
- eCos
- NetBSD
- Nucleus RTOS
- NuttX
- Minix
- NCOS
- freeRTOS, openRTOS, safeRTOS
- Fuchsia
- OpenEmbedded (or Yocto Project)
- OpenHarmony
- pSOS (Portable Software On Silicon)
- PX5 RTOS
- QNX – Unix-like real-time operating system, aimed primarily at the embedded systems market.
- REX OS – microkernel; usually an embedded cell phone OS
- RIOT
- ROM-DOS
- TinyOS
- ThreadX
- Tock
- RT-Thread
- DSPnano RTOS
- Windows IoT – formerly Windows Embedded
  - Windows CE
  - Windows IoT Core
  - Windows IoT Enterprise
- Wind River VxWorks RTOS.
- Wombat – microkernel; usually real-time embedded
- Zephyr
- LiteOS
- SuperTinyKernel RTOS

=== LEGO Mindstorms ===
- brickOS
- leJOS

== Capability-based ==
- Cambridge CAP computer – operating system demonstrated the use of security capabilities, both in hardware and software, also a useful fileserver, implemented in ALGOL 68C
- Flex machine – Custom microprogrammable hardware, with an operating system, (modular) compiler, editor, * garbage collector and filing system all written in ALGOL 68.
- HYDRA – Running on the C.mmp computer at Carnegie Mellon University, implemented in the programming language BLISS
- KeyKOS nanokernel
  - EROS microkernel
- V – from Stanford, early 1980s
- HarmonyOS NEXT
- Google Fuchsia
- Phantom OS

== See also ==
- Comparison of operating systems
- Comparison of real-time operating systems
- Timeline of operating systems

=== Category links ===
- Operating systems
  - Embedded operating systems
  - Real-time operating systems
