= Embedded application =

Embedded application may refer to:

- Embedded system
- Embedded operating system
