= Ver (command) =

Command in many command-line interpreters

ver
- Running ver on MS-DOS
- Developers: DEC, TSC, Heath Company, Microsoft, IBM, DR, Novell, Toshiba, JP Software, ReactOS Contributors
- Operating system: OS/8, FLEX, HDOS, DOS, MSX-DOS, FlexOS, SpartaDOS X, 4690 OS, OS/2, Windows, ReactOS, KolibriOS, SymbOS, DexOS
- Platform: Cross-platform
- Type: Command

In computing, ver (short for version) is a command in various command-line interpreters (shells) such as COMMAND.COM, cmd.exe and 4DOS/4NT. It prints the name and version of the operating system, the command shell, or in some implementations the version of other commands. It is roughly equivalent to the Unix command uname.

== Implementations ==
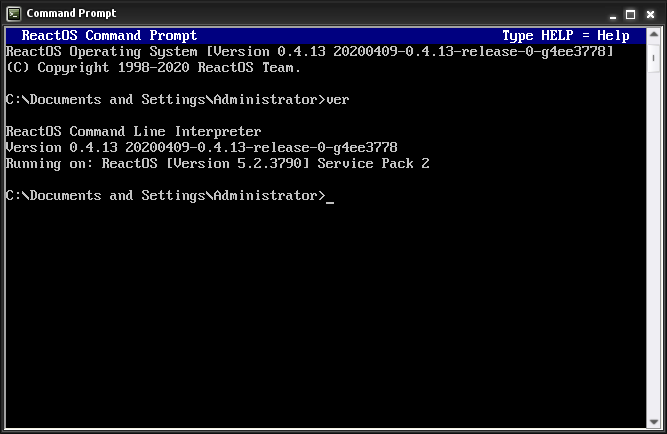
The ver command on ReactOS

The command is available in FLEX, HDOS, DOS, FlexOS, SpartaDOS X, 4690 OS, OS/2, Windows, and ReactOS. It is also available in the open-source MS-DOS emulator DOSBox, in the KolibriOS Shell and in the EFI shell.

=== TSC FLEX ===
In TSC's FLEX operating system, the VER command is used to display the version number of a utility or program. In some versions the command is called VERSION.

=== DOS ===
The command is available in MS-DOS versions 2 and later. MS-DOS versions up to 6.22 typically derive the DOS version from the DOS kernel. This may be different from the string printed on start-up. The argument "/r" can be added to give more information and to list whether DOS is running in the HMA (high memory area).

PC DOS typically derives the version from an internal string in command.com (so PC DOS 6.1 command.com reports the version as 6.10, although the kernel version is 6.00.)

DR DOS 6.0 also includes an implementation of the ver command. DR-DOS reports whatever value the environment variable OSVER reports.

PTS-DOS includes an implementation of this command that can display, modify, and restore the DOS version number.

=== IBM OS/2 ===
OS/2 command.com reports an internal string, with the OS/2 version. The underlying kernel here is 5.00, but modified to report x0.xx (where x.xx is the OS/2 version).

=== Microsoft Windows ===
The winver command on Windows 11

Windows 9x command.com report a string from inside command.com. The build version (e.g. 2222), is also derived from there.

Windows NT command.com reports either the 32-bit processor string (4nt, cmd), or under some loads, MS-DOS 5.00.500, (for all builds). The underlying kernel reports 5.00 or 5.50 depending on the interrupt. MS-DOS 5.00 commands run unmodified on NT.

Microsoft Windows also includes a GUI (Windows dialog) variant of the command called winver, which shows the Service Pack or Windows Update installed (if any) as well as the version. In Windows before Windows for Workgroups 3.11, running winver from DOS reported an embedded string in winver.exe.

Windows also includes the setver command that is used to set the version number that the MS-DOS subsystem (NTVDM) reports to a DOS program. This command is not available on Windows XP 64-Bit Edition.

=== DOSBox ===
In DOSBox, the command is used to view and set the reported DOS version. It also displays the running DOSBox version. The syntax to set the reported DOS version is the following:

VER SET <MAJOR> [MINOR]

The parameter MAJOR is the number before the period, and MINOR is what comes after. Versions can range from 0.0 to 255.255. Any values over 255 will loop from zero. (That is, 256=0, 257=1, 258=2, etc.)

=== Others ===
AmigaDOS provides a version command. It displays the current version number of the Kickstart and Workbench. The DEC OS/8 CCL ver command prints the version numbers of both the OS/8 Keyboard Monitor and CCL.

== Syntax ==
C:\WINDOWS\system32>ver

Microsoft Windows [Version 10.0.10586]

Some versions of MS-DOS support an undocumented /r switch, which will show the revision as well as the version.

== Version list ==
The following table lists version numbers from various Microsoft operating systems:

| Official | OS | Version number |
|---|---|---|
| | Windows 1.0 | 1.04 |
| | Windows 2.0 | 2.11 |
| | Windows 3.0 | 3 |
| | Windows NT 3.1 | 3.10.528 |
| | Windows for Workgroups 3.11 | 3.11 |
| | Windows NT 3.5 | 3.50.807 |
| | Windows NT 3.51 | 3.51.1057 |
| | Windows 95 | 4.00.950 |
| | Windows 95 OSR2 | 4.00.1111 |
| | Windows 95 OSR2.1 | 4.03.1212-1214 |
| | Windows 95 OSR2.5 | 4.03.1214-1216 |
| | Windows NT 4.0 | 4.00.1381 |
| | Windows 98 | 4.10.1998 |
| | Windows 98 SE | 4.10.2222 |
| — | Windows ME Beta | 4.90.2380.2 |
| — | Windows ME Beta 2 | 4.90.2419 |
| | Windows ME | 4.90.3000 |
| — | Windows NT 5.0 Beta | 5.00.1515 |
| — | Windows 2000 Beta 3 | 5.00.2031 |
| — | Windows 2000 RC2 | 5.00.2128 |
| — | Windows 2000 RC3 | 5.00.2183 |
| Yes | Windows 2000 | 5.00.2195 |
| Yes | Windows 2000 Professional | 5.0.2195 |
| — | Windows XP RC1 | 5.1.2505 |
| | Windows XP | 5.1.2600 |
| | Windows XP SP1 | 5.1.2600.1105-1106 |
| | Windows XP SP2 | 5.1.2600.2180 |
| | Windows XP SP3 | 5.1.2600 |
| | Windows .NET Server interim | 5.2.3541 |
| — | Windows .NET Server Beta 3 | 5.2.3590 |
| | Windows .NET Server RC1 | 5.2.3660 |
| | Windows .NET Server 2003 RC2 | 5.2.3718 |
| — | Windows Server 2003 Beta | 5.2.3763 |
| | Windows XP Professional x64 Edition; Windows Server 2003; Windows Home Server | 5.2.3790 |
| | Windows Server 2003 SP1 | 5.2.3790.1180 |
| | Windows Server 2003 | 5.2.3790.1218 |
| | Windows Longhorn | 6.0.5048 |
| — | Windows Vista Beta 1 | 6.0.5112 |
| — | Windows Vista CTP | 6.0.5219 |
| — | Windows Vista TAP Preview | 6.0.5259 |
| — | Windows Vista CTP December | 6.0.5270 |
| — | Windows Vista CTP February | 6.0.5308 |
| — | Windows Vista CTP Refresh | 6.0.5342 |
| — | Windows Vista April EWD | 6.0.5365 |
| — | Windows Vista Beta 2 Preview | 6.0.5381 |
| — | Windows Vista Beta 2 | 6.0.5384 |
| — | Windows Vista Pre-RC1 Build 5456 | 6.0.5456 |
| — | Windows Vista Pre-RC1 Build 5472 | 6.0.5472 |
| — | Windows Vista Pre-RC1 Build 5536 | 6.0.5536 |
| — | Windows Vista RC1 | 6.0.5600.16384 |
| — | Windows Vista Pre-RC2 | 6.0.5700 |
| — | Windows Vista Pre-RC2 Build 5728 | 6.0.5728 |
| — | Windows Vista RC2 | 6.0.5744.16384 |
| — | Windows Vista Pre-RTM Build 5808 | 6.0.5808 |
| — | Windows Vista Pre-RTM Build 5824 | 6.0.5824 |
| — | Windows Vista Pre-RTM Build 5840 | 6.0.5840 |
| | Windows Vista | 6.0.6000 |
| | Windows Vista RTM | 6.0.6000.16386 |
| | Windows Vista SP1; Windows Server 2008 SP1 | 6.0.6001 |
| | Windows Vista SP2; Windows Server 2008 SP2 | 6.0.6002 |
| | Windows 7 Windows Server 2008 R2 | 6.1.7600 |
| | Windows 7 Windows Server 2008 R2 RTM | 6.1.7600.16385 |
| Yes | Windows 7 SP1; Windows Server 2008 R2 SP1 | 6.1.7601 |
| | Windows Home Server 2011 | 6.1.8400 |
| — | Windows Server 2012 Developer Preview; Windows 8 Developer Preview | 6.2.8102 |
| | Windows 8 Windows Server 2012 | 6.2.9200 |
| | Windows 8 RTM | 6.2.9200.16384 |
| | Windows Phone 8 | 6.2.10211 |
| | Windows 8.1; Windows Server 2012 R2 | 6.3.9200 |
| | Windows 8.1 Update 1 Windows Server 2012 R2 | 6.3.9600 |
| — | Windows 10 Technical Preview 1 | 6.4.9841 |
| — | Windows 10 Technical Preview 2 | 6.4.9860 |
| — | Windows 10 Technical Preview 3 | 6.4.9879 |
| — | Windows 10 Technical Preview 4 | 10.0.9926 |
| — | Windows 10 Technical Preview 5 | 10.0.10041 |
| — | Windows 10 Technical Preview 6 | 10.0.10049 |
| Yes | Windows 10 Threshold 1 (Windows 10 RTM) | 10.0.10240 |
| Yes | Windows 10 Threshold 2 (November Update, Version 1511) | 10.0.10586 |
| Yes | Windows 10 Redstone 1 (Anniversary Update, Version 1607); Windows Server 2016 | 10.0.14393 |
| — | Windows 10 Insider Preview | 10.0.14915 |
| Yes | Windows 10 Redstone 2 (Creators Update, Version 1703) | 10.0.15063 |
| Yes | Windows 10 Redstone 3 (Fall Creators Update, Version 1709) | 10.0.16299 |
| Yes | Windows 10 Redstone 4 (April 2018 Update, Version 1803) | 10.0.17134 |
| Yes | Windows 10 Redstone 5 (October 2018 Update, Version 1809) | 10.0.17763 |
| Yes | Windows 10 19H1 May 2019 (Version 1903) | 10.0.18362 |
| Yes | Windows 10 19H2 November 2019 (Version 1909) | 10.0.19002 |
| Yes | Windows 10 20H1 May 2020 (Version 2004) | 10.0.19041 |
| Yes | Windows 10 20H2 October 2020 (Version 20H2) | 10.0.19042 |
| Yes | Windows 10 21H1 May 2021 (Version 2009) | 10.0.19043 |
| Yes | Windows 10 21H2 November 2021 (Version 21H2) | 10.0.19044 |
| Yes | Windows 10 22H2 October 2022 (Version 22H2) | 10.0.19045 |
| Yes | Windows 11 October 2021 (RTM) | 10.0.22000 |
| Yes | Windows 11 September 2022 (Version 22H2) | 10.0.22621 |
| Yes | Windows 11 October 2023 (Version 23H2) | 10.0.22631 |
| Yes | Windows 11 October 2024 (Version 24H2) | 10.0.26100 |

== See also ==
- Comparison of Microsoft Windows versions
- List of DOS commands
- uname
