= TinyVM =

TinyVM is a small Java Virtual Machine primarily designed for use embedded systems with low memory. In 2000, the project was forked into LeJOS.
