= Real-Time Multiprogramming Operating System =

Real-Time Multiprogramming Operating System (RTMOS) was a 24-bit process control operating system developed in the 1960s by General Electric that supported both real-time computing and multiprogramming. Programming was done in assembly language or Process FORTRAN. The two languages could be used in the same program, allowing programmers to alternate between the two as desired.

Multiprogramming operating systems are now considered obsolete, having been replaced by multitasking.
