= Microport Systems =

American software company (1985–2002)

- Type: Private
- Industry: Software development
- Founded: 1985
- Founder: Chuck Hickey
- Defunct: 2002
- Fate: Bankruptcy
- Headquarters: United States
- Products: UNIX port

Microport Systems (1985–2002) was a software development group that pioneered a new approach towards software ports that dramatically reduced development costs and, consequently, the price charged for UNIX. Microport created the first ports of AT&T's UNIX System V for the IBM 286 (Unix System V/AT) and 386 personal computers, as well as IBM's PS/2 systems. Microport was critical to enabling the Free Software Foundation (FSF) to port its GNU C compiler (gcc) and associated utilities, onto the x86 architecture by donating a complete 386 development system to the Richard Stallman-led group. Microport also played a key role in Kevin Mitnick's first arrest, after he broke into the internal computer networks of both Microport and The Santa Cruz Operation.

== History ==
=== Founding ===
In 1983, AT&T announced UNIX System V at the West Coast Computer Faire in Anaheim, California. In an effort to promote System V, AT&T created a program with Intel, Motorola, Zilog, and other major CPU manufacturers at the time. Through this program, AT&T paid each of the processor manufacturers to port System V onto a standard hardware "reference" platform for each company's flagship CPU. By providing this software with the reference hardware, computer manufacturers could easily put UNIX onto their new systems, with a substantial reduction in cost. Prior to this, each hardware platform required its own UNIX port that required significant resources and time to develop. By providing a port for similar hardware designs, development cost was substantially reduced, typically only requiring minor modifications. This new porting process required only a few developers and led to the name Microport.

Microport's early days were characterized by an early hacker-driven environment. Founder Chuck Hickey realized that the AT&T port for the Intel's System 86/30 could be easily modified for the IBM 286 personal computer (PC), bringing the AT&T System V UNIX technology to the PC for the first time. Hickey was able to assemble a small team of four developers in September 1985 using incentives and little pay for compensation. Because of the lean operation, the reduced cost allowed the software to be sold at $99. At the time, Microport's main competitor, Santa Cruz Operation (SCO), sold their base XENIX Operating System for $500.

Microport demonstrated their product for the first time at the COMDEX trade-show in November 1985 after only two months of development. This demo and announcement paved the way for its initial business opportunities and brought Microport to the attention of IBM, SCO, and Microsoft. NCR was Microport's first customer, giving them a contract worth $100,000. With this money, Microport was able to complete the final version of System V for the IBM 286 PC and begin work on the System V port to the IBM 386 PC in September 1986. It took SCO several years to catch up with the System V, Release 3 (SVR3) technology that Microport brought out in the mid 1980s for the IBM 386 PC.

Following its founding days, Microport gradually adopted an increasingly corporate environment that catered more towards large OEM and VAR deals. This change also marked the beginning of a period plagued by severe financial mismanagement that ultimately sank the company.

=== Major events ===
==== Applications ====
Microport ran into an early problem competing for business contracts due to a lack of application software for its operating system (OS) ports. Due to a lack of funds, Microport could not contract application companies to port and certify their software to each new OS. As an alternative, Microport attempted to develop compatibility with any Xenix application (i.e. Xenix binary compatibility) to allow all SCO and Microsoft Xenix OS applications to also run on UNIX. SCO and Microsoft threatened to sue Microport, consequently ending any development efforts for Xenix binary compatibility. Microport was able to eventually gain application software support by using the AT&T-funded application development for the 6300+ Personal Computer, which was compatible with the standard System V. Because Microport had adhered to the System V standard, their OS ports were easily made compatible with all applications developed for the 6300+.

==== The 386 version of System V ====
In 1986, Microport became the first company to put System V UNIX on the newly released IBM 386 PC by using Interactive Systems Corporation's (ISC) System V port for Intel's 386 Tahoe platform. Microport beat ISC on delivery for the PC port by three weeks. This product later moved from its beta version to production status when AT&T announced the full availability of SVR3 the next year.

Microport also ported SVR2 to the IBM AT.

==== Investment and bankruptcy ====
In 1986, after deployment of its version of the 386 port, Microport received an investment from Televideo of over $1M for 51% of the company stock and established an international division. Beginning in 1988, sales declined as ISC, Bell Technologies, Everex, and others started selling their version of the 386 port, eroding Microport's market position and making continued inflow of investment capital unlikely. Realizing that survival of the company was now dependent upon full acquisition of the company by Televideo or another company, Hickey stepped down as CEO putting CFO Greg Chavez in charge.

Greg Chavez attempted to sell the company without success. By early 1989, Microport had run up debts of about $1M. In the spring of that year, Chavis left and Televideo resigned from the board of directors. The company entered Chapter 11 bankruptcy and a court-approved specialist was selected to run the company. Microport continued to operate under Chapter 11 bankruptcy provisions for nearly two years with reduced staff size.

=== Post-bankruptcy ===
In May 1990, Microport was purchased from bankruptcy by Abraxas software. It joined Unix International and participated in the software development for the first multiprocessor with Unisys, Intel, and Sequent Computer Systems. Microport was among the first to compile System V, Release 4 (SVR4) for the Pentium processor and was credited with having the best serial device driver among all of the UNIX vendors.

In 1992, Microport dropped its own UNIX development and became a reseller of UnixWare (SVR4.2) after Novell bought the rights to UNIX. Microport maintained development for select drivers and still closed large OEM deals until SCO bought the rights to UnixWare from Novell in December 1995. Microport became a reseller for SCO, which failed to recognize the threat posed by Linux and Berkeley Software Distribution (BSD). Microport's CEOs never took the FSF or Open Source movement seriously despite the fact that some of its original development staff had assisted the FSF. Mike Grinder, an early Microport employee, took over as the head of Microport prior to its final bankruptcy and closing in 2002.

== Impact ==
Microport was the first group to create a low-cost UNIX implementation that was accessible to hobbyist and the average consumer. Previously, access to UNIX was limited to either expensive minicomputers or XENIX and other UNIX derivatives that were targeted toward large OEM and VAR commercial deals. Although Microport later targeted sales towards OEMs and VARs, they had created a new market opportunity for other low-cost UNIX technology to follow, including Linux and BSD for the PCs in the 1990s.
