= FLEX (operating system) =

Single-tasking operating system for the Motorola 6800

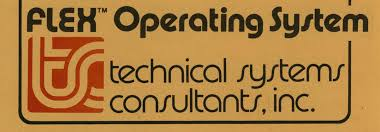
- Logo of FLEX

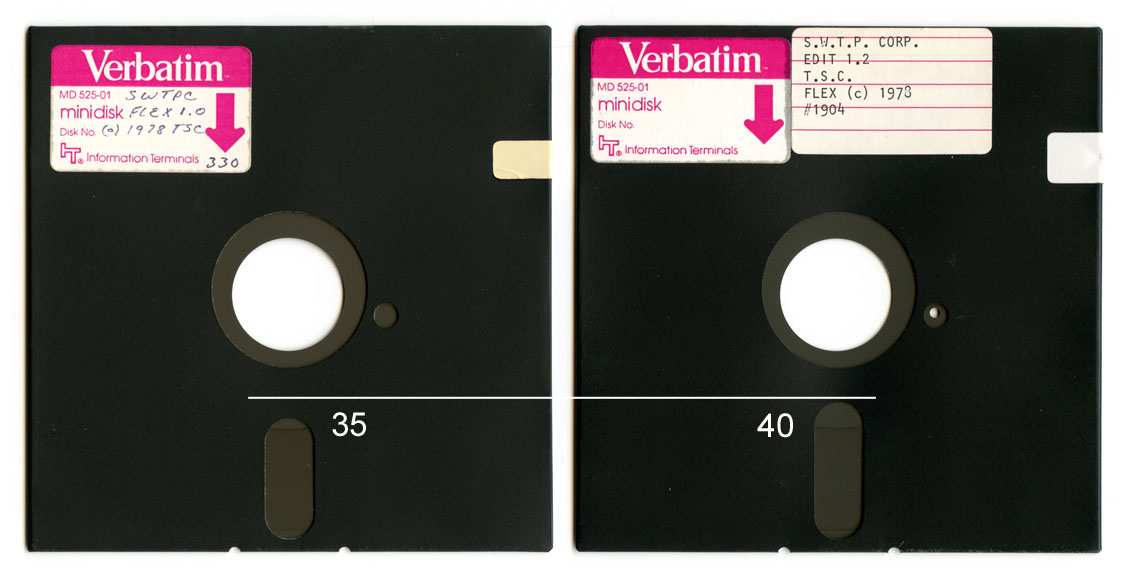
- FLEX, as distributed on 5.25 inch Floppy disks
- Developer: Technical Systems Consultants
- Working state: Discontinued
- Source model: Open source
- Initial release: 1976; 50 years ago
- Latest release: 2.0 / October 3, 1985; 40 years ago
- Available in: English
- Supported platforms: Motorola 6800, Motorola 6809
- Kernel type: Monolithic
- Default user interface: Command-line interface

FLEX is a discontinued single-tasking operating system developed by Technical Systems Consultants (TSC) of West Lafayette, Indiana, for the Motorola 6800 in 1976.

== Overview ==
The original version was distributed on 8-inch floppy disks; the (smaller) version for 5.25-inch floppies is called mini-Flex. It was also later ported to the Motorola 6809; that version is called Flex09. All versions are text-based and intended for use on display devices ranging from printing terminals like the Teletype Model 33 ASR to smart terminals. While no graphic displays are supported by TSC software, some hardware supports elementary graphics and pointing devices.

FLEX is a disk-based operating system, using 256-byte sectors on soft-sectored floppies; the disk structure uses linkage bytes in each sector to indicate the next sector in a file or free list. The directory structure is simplified as a result. TSC (and others) provide several programming languages including BASIC in two flavors (standard and extended) and a tokenizing version of extended BASIC called Pre-compiled BASIC, FORTH, C, FORTRAN, and PASCAL.

TSC also wrote a version of FLEX, Smoke Signal DOS, for the California hardware manufacturer Smoke Signal Broadcasting; this version uses forward and reverse linkage bytes in each sector which increase disk reliability at the expense of compatibility and speed.

Later, TSC introduced the multitasking, multi-user, Unix-like UniFLEX operating system, which requires DMA disk controllers, 8" disk, and sold in small numbers. Several of the TSC computer languages were ported to UniFLEX.

During the early 1980s, FLEX was offered by Compusense Ltd as an operating system for the 6809-based Dragon 64 home computer.

=== Commands ===
The following commands are supported by different versions of the FLEX operating system.

- APPEND
- ASN
- BACKUP
- BUILD
- CAT
- COPY
- COPYNEW
- C4MAT
- CLEAN
- DATE
- DELETE
- ECHO
- EXEC
- FIX
- GET
- I
- JUMP
- LINK
- LIST
- MEMTEST1
- MON
- N
- NEWDISK
- O
- P
- P.COR
- PO
- PRINT
- PROT
- PSP
- Q
- QCHECK
- READPROM
- RENAME
- RM
- S
- SAVE
- SAVE.LOW
- SBOX
- SP
- STARTUP
- TOUCH
- TTYSET
- UCAL
- USEMF
- VER
- VERIFY
- VERSION
- WRITPROM
- XOUT
- Y

== See also ==
- Microsoft BASIC-68 for FLEX
- Microsoft BASIC-69 for FLEX
