= ILIOS =

ILIOS is an acronym of InterLink Internet Operating System. It is an attempt to create a router-only operating system; one specifically oriented towards computer networking purposes, especially routing. It supports IPv4 routing and is a good educational OS, though it is single tasking and does everything via interrupts.

It is released under the BSD License. The author of this research OS is Rink Springer, who is also responsible for porting FreeBSD to the Xbox.
