= Visopsys =

32-bit operating system for PC

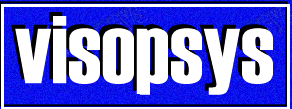
- Developer: Andy McLaughlin
- Written in: C, Assembly language
- Source model: Open source
- Initial release: 2 August 2001; 23 years ago
- Latest release: 0.92 / 21 September 2023; 19 months ago
- Kernel type: Monolithic
- License: GPL, LGPL
- Official website: visopsys.org

Visopsys (Visual Operating System), is an operating system, written by Andy McLaughlin. Development of the operating system began in 1997. The operating system is licensed under the GNU GPL, with the headers and libraries under the less restrictive LGPL license. It runs on the 32-bit IA-32 architecture. It features a multitasking kernel, supports asynchronous I/O and the FAT line of file systems. It requires a Pentium processor.

== History ==
The development of Visopsys began in 1997, being written by Andy McLaughlin. The first public release of the Operating System was on 2 March 2001, with version 0.1. In this release, Visopsys was a 32 bit operating system, supporting preemptive multitasking and virtual memory.

== System overview ==
Visopsys uses a monolithic kernel, written in the C programming language, with elements of assembly language for certain interactions with the hardware. The operating system supports a graphical user interface, with a small C library.
