= ToaruOS =

Independently-developed hobby operating system

- Developer: K. Lange
- Written in: C
- OS family: Unix-like
- Working state: Current
- Source model: Open source
- Initial release: January 30, 2017; 9 years ago
- Latest release: 2.3.2 / May 13, 2026; 50 days ago
- Repository: github.com/klange/toaruos
- Supported platforms: x86-64 aarch64
- Kernel type: Hybrid
- License: UIUC License
- Official website: www.toaruos.org

ToaruOS (also known as ToAruOS or とあるOS; 'toaru' is Japanese roughly equivalent to 'a certain') is a hobby operating system and kernel developed largely independently (notably contrary to most modern OSes, which are based on existing source code) by K. Lange. Despite a 1.0 version being released, Lange has stated that it is still 'incomplete', and may not be 'suitable for any purpose you might have for an operating system'. It is released under the permissive UIUC License, and supports 64-bit computer hardware with SMP.

== Design and features ==
ToaruOS is programmed in C, and uses the Cairo graphics library. It has support for GCC, Python, and Simple DirectMedia Layer as well as many open-source utilities – including Vim. A package manager and basic window switcher are also included.

The kernel is a 'basic Unix-like environment'. It has a hybrid architecture, with internal and external device support being delegated to modules. Several filesystems are supported via this system, including ext2 and ISO 9660. Networking support is included, but is limited to simple IPv4 functionality. The userspace also has a window manager, Yutani (named after the Weyland-Yutani Corporation from the Alien franchise, and as a reference to the Wayland Display Server for Linux), with input support. It stores windows as shared memory regions with 32-bit colour, and uses pipes to communicate to other parts of the OS. Unusually, windows also support a rotation feature.

== History ==
Development was started by creator K. Lange in December 2010; it initially was supported by the University of Illinois at Urbana–Champaign, but after the beginning of 2012, it largely shifted to being mostly done by Lange. Initially, it was based on tutorials for x86 kernels. The operating system was named after the A Certain Scientific Railgun series of manga, but Lange stated it also mirrors generic naming of other hobby OSes. A GUI was added with a window manager in 2012, this was replaced with a more advanced version in 2014.

The initial official release, version 1.0, was released at the end of January 2017. This marked the first stable release, but Lange stated it was still 'a work in development with so much work left to be done'. This was superseded by versions 1.0.1 and 1.0.2, which added audio improvements and fixed bugs.

For April Fools' Day 2015, Lange released PonyOS, a version of ToaruOS themed after the animated series My Little Pony: Friendship Is Magic.

== See also ==
- TempleOS – another operating system developed largely from scratch
- RedoxOS – another Unix-like independently developed OS
