= NCR VRX =

VRX is an acronym for Virtual Resource eXecutive, a proprietary operating system on the NCR Criterion series, and later the V-8000 series of mainframe computers manufactured by NCR Corporation during the 1970s and 1980s. It replaced the B3 Operating System originally distributed with the Century series, and inherited many of the features of the B4 Operating System from the high-end of the NCR Century series of computers. VRX was upgraded in the late 1980s and 1990s to become VRX/E for use on the NCR 9800 (Criterion) series of computers. Edward D. Scott managed the development team of 150 software engineers who developed VRX and James J "JJ" Whelan was the software architect responsible for technical oversight and the overall architecture of VRX. Tom Tang was the Director of Engineering at NCR responsible for development of the entire Criterion family of computers. This product line achieved over $1B in revenue and $300M in profits for NCR.

VRX was shipped to its first customers, on a trial basis, in 1977. Customer sites included the United Farm Workers labor union, who in 1982 were running an NCR 8555 mainframe running VRX.

VRX was NCR's response to IBM's MVS virtual storage operating system and was NCR's first virtual storage system. It was based on a segmented page architecture provided in the Criterion architecture.

The Criterion series provided a virtual machine architecture which allowed different machine architectures running under the same operating system. The initial offering provided a Century virtual machine which was instruction compatible with the Century series and a COBOL virtual machine designed to optimize programs written in COBOL. Switching between virtual machines was provided by a virtual machine indicator in the subroutine call mechanism. This allowed programs written in one virtual machine to use subroutines written for another. The same mechanism was used to enter an "executive" state used for operating system functions and a "privileged system" state used for direct access to hardware.
