= BESYS =

BESYS (Bell Operating System)
- Developer: Bell Labs
- Written in: IBM's FORTRAN and North American's Symbolic Assembly Program (SAP)
- Working state: Discontinued
- Initial release: 1957; 69 years ago
- Latest release: BE90 / 1968; 58 years ago
- Supported platforms: IBM 704

BESYS (Bell Operating System) was an early computing environment originally implemented as a batch processing operating system in 1957 at Bell Labs for the IBM 704 computer.

== Overview ==
The system was developed because Bell recognized a "definite mismatch...between the 704's internal speed, the sluggishness of its on-line unit-record equipment, and the inherent slowness of manual operations associated with stand-alone use." According to Drummond, the name BESYS, though commonly thought to stand for BEll SYStem, is actually a concatenation of the preexisting SHARE-assigned installation code BE for Bell Telephone Laboratories, Murray Hill, NJ and the code assigned by SHARE for systems software, SYS.

The goals of the system were:

- Flexible use of hardware, nonstop operation.
- Efficient batch processing, tape-to-tape operation with offline spooling of unit-record data.
- Use of control cards to minimize the need for operator intervention.
- Allow user programs access to input/output functions, system control and program libraries.
- Core dump facilities for debugging.
- Simulation of L1 and L2 interpreters to provide software compatibility with the IBM 650.

The initial version of the system BESYS-1 was in use by October 16, 1957. It was created by George H. Mealy and Gwen Hansen with Wanda Lee Mammel and utilized IBM's FORTRAN and United Aircraft's Symbolic Assembly Program (SAP) programming languages. It was designed to efficiently deal with a large number of jobs originating on punched cards and producing results suitable for printing on paper and punched cards. The system also provided processing capabilities for data stored on magnetic tapes and magnetic disk storage units. Typically punched card and print processing was handled off line by peripheral Electronic Accounting Machines, IBM 1401 computers, and eventually direct coupled computers.

The first system actually used at Bell Labs was BESYS-2. The system was resident on magnetic tape, and occupied the lowest 64 (36-bit) words and the highest 4K words of memory. The upper 4K words held the resident portion of the monitor, and could be partially swapped to magnetic drum to free up additional core for the user program if needed.

"BESYS was a complex software package that provided convenient input/output and integrated disk file storage facilities."

== Internal use ==
BESYS was used extensively by many departments of Bell Labs for over a decade. It was made available through the SHARE organization to others without charge or formal technical support.

== BESYS versions ==
Versions of the BESYS environment (BESYS-3 (1960), BESYS-4 (1962), BESYS-5 (1963), BESYS-7 (1964), and BE90 (1968)) were implemented as the underlying computers transitioned through the IBM 709X family. BESYS development was discontinued when Bell Labs moved to the IBM System/360 in 1969. Throughout this period the head of the BESYS development project was George L. Baldwin.
