= Technical Systems Consultants =

Defunct supplier of software for SWTPC computers

Technical Systems Consultants (TSC)
- Industry: Computer software
- Founded: West Lafayette, Indiana, United States
- Founder: Don Kinzer, Dave Shirk
- Headquarters: Chapel Hill, North Carolina, United States
- Products: FLEX, UniFLEX

Technical Systems Consultants, Inc. (TSC), was a United States software company. It was founded in West Lafayette, Indiana, in 1976 by Don Kinzer and Dave Shirk, EE graduate students at Purdue University. In 1980, the company moved to Chapel Hill, North Carolina, it was the foremost supplier of software for SWTPC compatible hardware, as well as many other early makes of personal computers. Their software included operating systems (Flex, mini-FLEX, FLEX09, and UniFlex) and various languages (several BASIC variants, FORTRAN, Pascal, C and assemblers). The company dissolved in 1998.
