= Less-than sign =

Mathematical symbol for "less than"

<o

Less-than sign
- In Unicode: U+003C < LESS-THAN SIGN (&lt;, &LT;)

Related
- See also: similar symbols listed below

The less-than sign is a mathematical symbol that denotes an inequality between two values. The widely adopted form of two equal-length strokes connecting in an acute angle at the left, <, has been found in documents dated as far back as the 1560s. In mathematical writing, the less-than sign is typically placed between two values being compared and signifies that the first number is less than the second number. Examples of typical usage include 1 < 4 and −2 < 0.

Since the development of computer programming languages, the less-than sign and the greater-than sign have been repurposed for a range of uses and operations.

== Computing ==
The less-than sign, <, is an original ASCII character (hex 3C, decimal 60).

=== Programming ===
In BASIC, Lisp-family languages, and C-family languages (including Java and C++), comparison operator < means "less than".

In Coldfusion, operator .lt. means "less than".

In Fortran, operator .LT. means "less than"; later versions allow <.

==== Shell scripts ====
In Bourne shell (and many other shells), operator -lt means "less than". Less-than sign is used to redirect input from a file. Less-than plus ampersand (<&) is used to redirect from a file descriptor.

==== Double less-than sign ====
The double less-than sign, <<, may be used for an approximation of the much-less-than sign (≪) or of the opening guillemet («). ASCII does not encode either of these signs, though they are both included in Unicode.

In Bash, Perl, and Ruby, operator <<EOF (where "EOF" is an arbitrary string, but commonly "EOF" denoting "end of file") is used to denote the beginning of a here document.

In C and C++, operator << represents a binary left shift.

In the C++ Standard Library, operator <<, when applied on an output stream, acts as insertion operator and performs an output operation on the stream.

In Ruby, operator << acts as append operator when used between an array and the value to be appended.

In XPath the << operator returns true if the left operand precedes the right operand in document order; otherwise it returns false.

==== Triple less-than sign ====
In PHP, operator <<<OUTPUT is used to denote the beginning of a heredoc statement (where OUTPUT is an arbitrary named variable.)

In Bash, <<<word is used as a "here string", where word is expanded and supplied to the command on its standard input, similar to a heredoc.

==== Less-than sign with equals sign ====
The less-than sign with the equals sign, <=, may be used for an approximation of the less-than-or-equal-to sign, ≤. ASCII does not have a less-than-or-equal-to sign, but Unicode defines it at code point U+2264 ≤ LESS-THAN OR EQUAL TO.

In BASIC, Lisp-family languages, and C-family languages (including Java and C++), operator <= means "less than or equal to". In Sinclair BASIC it is encoded as a single-byte code point token.

In Prolog, =< means "less than or equal to" (as distinct from the arrow <=).

In Fortran, operators .LE. and <= both mean "less than or equal to".

In Bourne shell and Windows PowerShell, the operator -le means "less than or equal to".

==== Less-than sign with hyphen-minus ====
In the R programming language, the less-than sign is used in conjunction with a hyphen-minus to create an arrow (<-), this can be used as the left assignment operator.

==== Spaceship operator ====
The less-than sign is used in the spaceship operator.

==== HTML ====
In HTML (and SGML and XML), the less-than sign is used at the beginning of tags. The less-than sign may be included with &lt;. The less-than-or-equal-to sign, ≤, may be included with &le;.

== Unicode ==
Unicode provides various less than symbols:

Symbol	Unicode name	Code Point
<	Less-Than Sign	U+003C
≤	Less-Than Or Equal To	U+2264
≦	Less-Than Over Equal To	U+2266
≨	Less-Than But Not Equal To	U+2268
≪	Much Less-Than	U+226A
≮	Not Less Than	U+226E
≰	Neither Less-Than Nor Equal To	U+2270
≲	Less-Than Or Equivalent To	U+2272
≴	Neither Less-Than Nor Equivalent To	U+2274
⋖	Less-Than With Dot	U+22D6
⋘	Very Much Less-Than	U+22D8
⋜	Equal To Or Less-Than	U+22DC
⋦	Less-Than But Not Equivalent To	U+22E6
⍃	Apl Functional Symbol Quad Less-Than	U+2343
⥶	Less-Than Above Leftwards Arrow	U+2976
⥷	Leftwards Arrow Through Less-Than	U+2977
⦓	Left Arc Less-Than Bracket	U+2993
⦖	Double Right Arc Less-Than Bracket	U+2996
⧀	Circled Less-Than	U+29C0
⩹	Less-Than With Circle Inside	U+2A79
⩻	Less-Than With Question Mark Above	U+2A7B
⩽	Less-Than Or Slanted Equal To	U+2A7D
⩿	Less-Than Or Slanted Equal To With Dot Inside	U+2A7F
⪁	Less-Than Or Slanted Equal To With Dot Above	U+2A81
⪃	Less-Than Or Slanted Equal To With Dot Above Right	U+2A83
⪅	Less-Than Or Approximate	U+2A85
⪇	Less-Than And Single-Line Not Equal To	U+2A87
⪉	Less-Than And Not Approximate	U+2A89
⪍	Less-Than Above Similar Or Equal	U+2A8D
⪕	Slanted Equal Or Less-Than	U+2A95
⪗	Slanted Equal Or Less-Than With Dot Inside	U+2A97
⪙	Double-Line Equal To Or Less-Than	U+2A99
⪛	Double-Line Slanted Equal To Or Less-Than	U+2A9B
⪝	Similar To Or Less-Than	U+2A9D
⪟	Similar Above Less-Than Above Equals Sign	U+2A9F
⪡	Double Nested Less-Than	U+2AA1
⪣	Double Nested Less-Than With Underbar	U+2AA3
⪦	Less-Than Closed By Curve	U+2AA6
⪨	Less-Than Closed By Curve Above Slanted Equal	U+2AA8
⫷	Triple Nested Less-Than	U+2AF7
⫹	Double-line Slanted Less-than Or Equal To	U+2AF9
﹤	Small Less-Than Sign	U+FE64
＜	Fullwidth Less-Than	U+FF1C

The less-than sign may be seen for an approximation of the opening angle bracket, ⟨. True angle bracket characters, as required in linguistics notation, are expected in formal texts.

== Mathematics ==
In an inequality, the less-than sign and greater-than sign always "point" to the smaller number. Put another way, the "jaws" (the wider section of the symbol) always direct to the larger number.

The less-than-sign is sometimes used to represent a total order, partial order or preorder. However, the symbol $\prec$ is often used when it would be confusing or not convenient to use <. In mathematical writing using LaTeX, the TeX command is \prec. The Unicode code point is U+227A ≺ PRECEDES.

== See also ==
- Inequality (mathematics)
- Greater-than sign
- Relational operator
- Much-less-than sign
