= PWB =

PWB may refer to:

- Partial Weight-bearing, in which patients are instructed to put only a certain amount of weight on their leg after surgery
- Printed wiring board
- Psychological well-being
- Programmer's Workbench,
  - an early UNIX from Bell Labs, see PWB/UNIX
  - a Text-based user interface, Integrated development environment (IDE) by Microsoft, see History of Visual C++
- Phoebe Waller-Bridge, English actress, playwright, producer, and writer.
