= Ttyrec =

Program and its file format

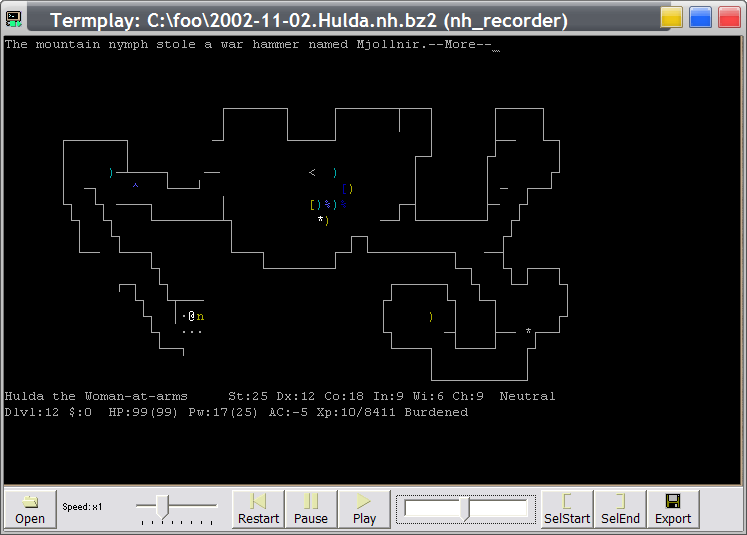
A NetHack recording being replayed using termrec

ttyrec is a program or its file format capable of recording the TTY output of a text-mode program together with timestamps and then replaying it.

It is widely used for example in the NetHack community for storing game replays.

It is similar to the script command, but also allows for pausing, slowing down or speeding up playback. It can also stream the recording on the network and be used to transfer files with uudecode.

== Recorders and players ==
- original ttyrec (Unix, abandoned)
- ovh-ttyrec (Unix)
- Term::TtyRec (Perl)
- Term::TtyRec::Plus (Perl)
- Tie::Handle::TtyRec (Perl)
- termrec (Win32, Unix)

=== Playback only ===
- TTYPLAYER (Java)
- IPBT (Unix)

== Technical file format specification ==
Each chunk consists of a header using 32bit unsigned little-endian numbers:

- sec – seconds, either since the beginning of the recording (0-based) or since the Unix epoch
- usec – 0..999999 microseconds
- len – length of the payload

and the actual payload written as text with vt100 control codes.

The 32-bit sec range makes the format susceptible to the Year 2038 problem.

The format does not contain any information about the character set used nor about the terminal size needed to play back the file. termrec will inject this information as \e%G for UTF-8 or \e%@ for not UTF-8 and as \e[8;Y;Xt for size, but not all players will understand these codes.

== Related formats ==
- nh-recorder
- Joey Hess's modifications of script
- RealLogs
