= SIMPL =

Inter-process communication system for Linux

- Developer: iCanProgram Inc.
- Stable release: 2012Jan26 SIMPL v3.3.7 Released / January 26, 2012; 14 years ago
- Operating system: Linux
- Type: Inter-process communication
- License: GNU Lesser General Public License
- Website: www.icanprogram.com/simpl/
- Repository: sourceforge.net/p/simpl/code/

Synchronous Interprocess Messaging Project for LINUX (SIMPL) is a free and open-source project that allows QNX-style synchronous message passing by adding a Linux library using user space techniques like shared memory and Unix pipes to implement SendMssg/ReceiveMssg/ReplyMssg inter-process messaging mechanisms.

== Mechanism ==
A client thread sending a message is BLOCKED (the process thread execution is temporarily suspended) until the server thread sends a received message acknowledgement, processes the message, and executes a reply. When the server thread replies the client thread becomes READY (unblocked). The server thread typically loops, waiting to receive a message from a client thread.

Blocking synchronizes the client thread execution, blocking it and implicitly schedules the server thread to be scheduled for execution without requiring explicit process control work by the kernel to determine which thread to run next as with other forms of IPC.

The send and receive operations are blocking and synchronous, reply doesn't block, the client thread is already blocked waiting for the reply and no additional synchronization is required. The server thread replies to the client and continues running while the kernel and/or networking code asynchronously passes the reply data to the client thread and marks it READY for execution.

== Advantages of synchronized message passing ==
Synchronized Message Passing has the following advantages:

- Simple coding model simplifies the task of partitioning a complex system and aids in testing
- Inherent thread synchronization coordinates the execution of communicating programs
- No data buffering is required
- Simplification of network interactions - threads can be in different programs on different machines

== Limitations ==
SIMPL does not appear to be thread safe.

== Similar projects ==
There is one other QNX-inspired synchronous message passing projects available for Linux. SRR IPC (for Send/Receive/Reply) by Sam Roberts and Andrew Thomas of Cogent Real-Time Systems, Inc. which is related to the SIMPL project and adds a QNX-compatible API layer. SRR is a loadable kernel module designed to be QNX API compatible to facilitate porting of code.

== See also ==
- Distributed computing
- Inter-process communication
