= Command substitution =

Feature of Unix shells and some programming languages

In computing, command substitution is a facility that allows a command to be run and its output to be pasted back on the command line as arguments to another command. Command substitution first appeared in the Bourne shell, introduced with Version 7 Unix in 1979, and has remained a characteristic of all later Unix shells. The feature has since been adopted in other programming languages as well, including Perl, PHP, Ruby and Microsoft's Powershell under Windows. It also appears in Microsoft's CMD.EXE in the FOR command and the ( ) command.

== Syntax and semantics ==
Shells typically implement command substitution by creating a child process to run the first command with its standard output piped back to the shell, which reads that output, parsing it into words separated by whitespace. Because the shell can't know it has all the output from the child until the pipe closes or the child dies, it waits until then before it starts another child process to run the second command.

This C shell example shows how one might search for all the C files containing the string malloc using fgrep and then edit any that are found using the vi editor. The syntactical notation shown here, ` ... `, using backquotes as delimiters, is the original style and is supported by all the common Unix shells.

#!/bin/csh
vi `fgrep -l malloc *.c`

Objections have been raised to both the syntax, how it's typed, and the semantics, how it works.

While easy to type, an important factor for an interactive command processor, the syntax has been criticized as awkward to nest, putting one command substitution inside another, because both the left and the right delimiters are the same. The KornShell (ksh) solved this with an alternative notation, $( ... ), borrowing from the notational style used for variable substitution. Today, most UNIX shells support this syntax. Microsoft's PowerShell also uses this notation, with the same semantics.

#!/bin/bash
vi $(fgrep -l malloc *.c)

The semantics, breaking the output into words at whitespace, has also been criticized. It worked well on early Unix systems where filenames never contained spaces but it doesn't work at all well on modern Windows and Linux systems where filenames certainly can contain spaces. In either of these previous examples, if any of the filenames matched by the *.c wildcard contains a space, that filename will be broken into two separate arguments to vi, clearly not what was intended. Hamilton C shell solved this with a double backquote notation, `` ... ``, that parses into words only at line breaks.

This is an example of command substitution using the () operator in PowerShell:

$MyVariable = (ls)
echo $MyVariable

== Expression substitution ==
A related facility, expression substitution, is found in the languages Common Lisp and Scheme, invoked by using the comma-at operator in an expression marked with the backquote (or "quasiquote") operator, and in ABC, by using an expression enclosed between backquotes inside a text display (string literal). For example, the ABC command WRITE '2 + 2 = `2+2`' produces the output 2 + 2 = 4.

== See also ==
- Process substitution
