= John Mashey =

American computer scientist (born 1946)

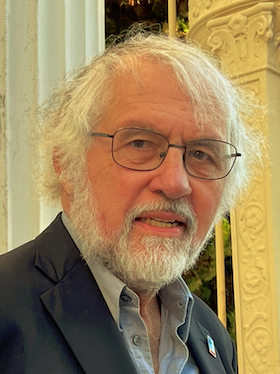
- Mashey in 2024
- Born: John R. Mashey; 1946 (age 79–80)
- Education: Pennsylvania State University (PhD)
- Spouse: Angela Hey

John R. Mashey (born 1946) is an American computer scientist and technology executive, recognized for his contributions to computer architecture, operating systems, and performance benchmarking, as well as his later work in science communication. He earned a Ph.D. in computer science from Pennsylvania State University, where he developed the ASSIST assembler language teaching software. At Bell Labs, he contributed to the development of PWB/UNIX and authored the "Mashey Shell". He later held leadership roles at Convergent Technologies, MIPS Computer Systems, and Silicon Graphics, where he helped design the MIPS RISC architecture and the NUMAflex modular system. A founder of the Standard Performance Evaluation Corporation (SPEC) and long-time organizer of the Hot Chips conferences, Mashey has been credited with popularizing the concept of big data in the 1990s. In recognition of his impact on computing, he received Penn State’s Outstanding Engineering Alumni Award and the USENIX Lifetime Achievement Award. In retirement, Mashey became active in science advocacy.

== Education ==
Mashey holds a Ph.D. in computer science from Pennsylvania State University, where he developed the ASSIST assembler language teaching software.

== Career ==
He worked on the PWB/UNIX operating system at Bell Labs from 1973 to 1983, authoring the PWB shell, also known as the "Mashey Shell". He then moved to Silicon Valley to join Convergent Technologies, ending as director of software. He joined MIPS Computer Systems in early 1985, managing operating systems development, and helping design the MIPS RISC architecture, as well as specific CPUs, systems and software. He continued similar work at Silicon Graphics (1992–2000), contributing to the design of the NUMAflex modular computer architecture using NUMAlink, ending as VP and chief scientist.

Mashey was one of the founders of the SPEC benchmarking group, was an ACM National Lecturer for four years, has been guest editor for IEEE Micro, and one of the long-time organizers of the Hot Chips conferences. He chaired technical conferences on operating systems and CPU chips, and gave public talks on software engineering, RISC design, performance benchmarking and supercomputing. He has been credited for being the first to spread the term and concept of big data in the 1990s. He became a consultant for venture capitalists and high-tech companies and a trustee of the Computer History Museum in 2001.

He has written articles for the Skeptical Inquirer regarding climate change denial. In 2010, he published a 250-page critical report on the Wegman Report. Mashey's report concluded that the Wegman Report contained plagiarized text. This story was featured in USA Today, and he was interviewed in Science magazine, which stated that he was "spending his retirement years compiling voluminous critiques of what he calls the 'real conspiracy' to produce 'climate antiscience'." His research has investigated the secretive funding of climate contrarian thinktanks. Mashey blogs at DeSmogBlog, which focuses on global warming.

Mashey became a scientific and technical consultant for the Committee for Skeptical Inquiry in 2015. He is a consultant for Techviser, a boutique consulting firm.

== Personal life ==
Mashey is married to Angela Hey, a Cambridge University and Waterloo University graduate with a Ph.D. from Imperial College, London.

== Awards and honors ==
In 1997, he received Pennsylvania State University's first Outstanding Engineering Alumni Award for Computer Science and Engineering. In 2012, he received the USENIX Lifetime Achievement Award ("Flame Award") "for his contributions to the UNIX community since its early days".
