= PWB/UNIX =

Early variant of Unix (1977) created by Bell Labs

Programmer's Workbench (PWB/UNIX)
- Developer: AT&T Bell Laboratories
- Written in: C
- OS family: Unix
- Working state: Discontinued
- Initial release: July 1, 1977; 48 years ago
- Latest release: 2.0
- Available in: English
- Instruction sets: DEC PDP-11
- Default user interface: Command-line interface (PWB shell)

The Programmer's Workbench (PWB/UNIX) was an early, now discontinued, version of the Unix operating system that had been created in the Bell Labs Computer Science Research Group of AT&T. Its stated goal was to provide a time-sharing working environment for large groups of programmers, writing software for larger batch processing computers.

Prior to 1973 Unix development at AT&T was a project of a small group of researchers in Department 1127 of Bell Labs. As the usefulness of Unix in other departments of Bell Labs was evident, the company decided to develop a version of Unix tailored to support programmers in production work, not just research. The Programmer's Workbench was started in 1973, by Evan Ivie and Rudd Canaday to support a computer center for a 1000-employee Bell Labs division, which would be the largest Unix site for several years. PWB/UNIX was to provide tools for teams of programmers to manage their source code and collaborate on projects with other team members. It also introduced several stability improvements beyond Research Unix, and broadened usage of the Research nroff and troff text formatters, via efforts with Bell Labs typing pools that led to the -mm macros.

While PWB users managed their source code on PDP-11 Unix systems, programs were often written to run on other operating systems. For this reason, PWB included software for submitting jobs to IBM System/370, UNIVAC 1100 series, and SDS Sigma 5 computers. In 1977 PWB supported a user community of about 1100 users in the Business Information Systems Programs (BISP) group of Bell Labs.

Two major releases of Programmer's Workbench were produced. PWB/UNIX 1.0, released July 1, 1977 was based on Version 6 Unix; PWB 2.0 was based on Version 7 Unix. The operating system was advertised by Bell System Software as late as 1981 and edition 1.0 was still on an AT&T price list for educational institutions in 1984. Most of PWB/UNIX was later incorporated in the commercial UNIX System III and UNIX System V releases.

== Features ==
Notable firsts in PWB include:

- The Source Code Control System, the first UNIX revision control system, written by Marc J. Rochkind
- The remote job entry batch-submission system
- The PWB shell, written by John R. Mashey, which preceded Steve Bourne's Bourne shell
- The restricted shell (rsh), an option of the PWB shell, used to create widely-available logins for status-checking, trouble-reporting, but made safe by restricting commands
- The troff -mm (memorandum) macro package, written by John R. Mashey and Dale W. Smith
- Utilities like find, cpio, expr, all three written by Dick Haight, xargs, egrep and fgrep
- yacc and lex, which, though not written specifically for PWB, were available outside of Bell Labs for the first time in the PWB distribution

== See also ==
- Research Unix
- Writer's Workbench ("WWB")
