= List of command-line interpreters =

This list includes notable command-line interpreter (CLI) – programs that interactively interpret programming languages and provide a command-line interface (cli) into which a user can enter commands.

== Operating system shells ==
Most operating systems are accessible via a shell – a command line interpreter. In some cases multiple shells are available.

This category somewhat overlaps with the general programming section since an operating system shell supports programming, and the line between operating system access and general programming is sometimes less than clear. For example, some versions of BASIC served as a shell, and BASIC is also a general-purpose language.

=== Unix-like ===
- Almquist shell (ash)
- Bash (Unix shell) bash
- Bourne shell sh
- C shell csh
- Ch shell ch
- Debian Almquist shell (dash)
- Emacs shell eshell
- Friendly interactive shell fish
- KornShell ksh
- PowerShell pwsh
- rc shell rc, a shell for Plan 9 from Bell Labs and Unix
- Stand-alone shell sash
- Scheme Shell scsh
- TENEX C shell tcsh
- Z shell zsh

=== Windows ===
- COMMAND.COM, the default shell in Windows 9x and an option in 32-bit NT-based Windows via NTVDM
- cmd.exe, a successor of COMMAND.COM in OS/2 and Windows NT systems, a.k.a. Command Prompt
- Recovery Console
- PowerShell, a .NET-based successor of Command Prompt that is more like Unix-based shells
- Hamilton C shell, a clone of the C shell
- Take Command Console (4NT), a clone of cmd.exe with added features

=== DOS ===
- COMMAND.COM, the default command-line interpreter
- 4DOS, a compatible, but more advanced shell
- NDOS, provided with some versions of Norton Utilities
- GW-BASIC

=== OS/2 ===
- CMD.EXE, the default command-line interpreter
- Hamilton C shell, a clone of the Unix C shell
- 4OS2, a clone of CMD.EXE with additional features

=== Apple ===
- Apple DOS/Apple ProDOS
- Macintosh Programmer's Workshop

=== CP/M ===
- Console Command Processor (CCP), the default command line interpreter
- ZCPR for the Z-System

=== IBM i ===
- Control Language
- Qshell

=== Network routers ===
- Cisco IOS
- Junos (Juniper Networks)

=== Other ===
- Atari TOS shell
- BASIC-PLUS (RSTS/E)
- CANDE MCS – command-line shell and text editor on the MCP operating system
- Conversational Monitor System (VM/CMS)
- Data General RDOS and AOS CLI
- DIGITAL Command Language (OpenVMS, various PDP-11 O/Ses...)
- DOS Wedge – (Commodore 64)
- EFI-SHELL
- Microsoft BASIC
- Singularity (operating system)
- SymShell
- Tandem Application Control Language (TACL)
- Time Sharing Option (MVS, z/OS)
- YouOS shell

== General-purpose programming ==
- APL
- BASIC
- BeanShell – shell for Java
- JavaScript shell – several programs by this name, including JavaScript Interpreter Shell, allow interactive JavaScript
- Common Lisp Interface Manager – for Lisp
- F#
- Haskell
- Interactive Ruby Shell – for Ruby
- IPython – for Python
- J
- Julia
- Jython
- Macintosh Programmer's Workshop, for Classic Mac OS
- Perl
- PHPsh – shell for PHP
- Prolog
- REBOL
- Red
- REXX
- Scala
- Smalltalk
- Standard ML
- Tclsh – for Tcl
- tkcon shell and IDE for Tcl/Tk
- Windows Script Host
- Wish (Windowing Shell) – for Tcl

== Software debugging ==
- DEBUG
- gdb
- DDT, a PDP-10 debugger from DEC used as a command shell for the MIT Incompatible Timesharing System
- Firebug/Chromebug, a JavaScript shell and debugging environment as a Firefox plugin

== Database development ==
- sqsh, a shell available with some SQL implementations for database queries and other tasks.
- Google Shell, a browser-based front-end for Google Search

== Scientific and engineering software ==
- MATLAB
- Wolfram Mathematica
- ROOT

== See also ==
- Comparison of command shells
- cygwin – Unix-like environment for Windows
- Interix – Unix subsystem for Windows NT operating systems
- Interpreter directive – Symbol "#!", used in computing
- Job Control Language – Job control language for IBM mainframes
- List of compilers
- Microsoft POSIX subsystem – Subsystem shipped with the first versions of Windows NT
- MKS Toolkit – Software package
- Scripting language – Programming language for automation scripts
- read–eval–print loop – Computer programming environment
- Windows Services for UNIX – Discontinued software produced by Microsoft which provided Unix environment on Windows NT
- Windows Subsystem for Linux – Feature for a Linux environment in Windows
