= Coprocess =

In computer science, a coprocess is a process that explicitly yields control to other processes or the operating system.

In Unix, a coprocess is a process that sends its output solely to the exact single process from which it solely received input.

Bash, BETA, ksh, and Zsh have language constructs for coprocesses.

== See also ==
- Deterministic concurrency
