= Command-line completion =

Software feature

Example of command-line completion in Bash.

Example of command-line completion in PowerShell with Intellisense.

Command-line completion (also tab completion) is a common feature of command-line interpreters, in which the program automatically fills in partially typed commands.

Command line interpreters are programs that allow a user to interact with the underlying operating system by typing commands at a command prompt using a command line interface (CLI), in contrast to pointing and clicking a mouse in a graphical user interface (GUI). Command-line completion allows the user to type the first few characters of a command, program, or filename, and press a completion key (normally Tab ↹) to fill in the rest of the item. The user then presses Return or ↵ Enter to run the command or open the file.

Command-line completion is useful in several ways, as illustrated by the animation accompanying this article. Commonly accessed commands, especially ones with long names, require fewer keystrokes to reach. Commands with long or difficult to spell filenames can be entered by typing the first few characters and pressing a completion key, which completes the command or filename. In the case of multiple possible completions, some command-line interpreters, especially Unix shells, will list all possible completions beginning with those few characters. The user can type more characters and press Tab ↹ again to see a new, narrowed-down list if the typed characters are still ambiguous, or else complete the command/filename with a trailing space. An alternate form of completion rotates through all matching results when the input is ambiguous.

Completable elements may include commands, arguments, file names and other entities, depending on the specific interpreter and its configuration. Command-line completion generally only works in interactive mode. That is, it cannot be invoked to complete partially typed commands in scripts or batch files, even if the completion is unambiguous. The name tab completion comes from the fact that command-line completion is often invoked by pressing the tab key.

== History ==
Tab completion appeared in the early 1960s.

The French SEA CAB 500 computer (ca. 1960) included an interactive language, PAF (Programmation Automatique de Formules), which provided command completion.

The command line of the Berkeley Timesharing System for the SDS 940 (ca. 1964) supported completion: if a typed command or filename was unambiguous, the interpreter would complete it without any user command; if the string was ambiguous, it did nothing. This meant that if the user typed more than the minimal prefix, the additional characters would be interpreted as part of the next input token, which is not what the user intended.

The TENEX operating system (ca. 1969) adopted the idea as escape completion, requiring the user to invoke autocompletion explicitly by typing escape.

The TENEX descendant TOPS-20 offered command line completion by 1977 as a system call, COMND JSYS, making it available to all applications.

Completion was added to Unix's tcsh command shell in 1981.

== Example ==
To open the file introduction-to-command-line-completion.html with Firefox one would type:

 firefox introduction-to-command-line-completion.html

This is a long command to type. Instead we can use command-line completion.

=== Prompting completion ===
The following example shows how command-line completion works in Bash. Other command line shells may perform slightly differently.

First we type the first three letters of our command:

 fir

Then we press Tab ↹ and because the only command in our system that starts with "fir" is "firefox", it will be completed to:

 firefox

Then we start typing the file name:

 firefox i

But this time introduction-to-command-line-completion.html is not the only file in the current directory that starts with "i". The directory also contains files introduction-to-bash.html and introduction-to-firefox.html. The system can't decide which of these filenames we wanted to type, but it does know that the file must begin with "introduction-to-", so the command will be completed to:

 firefox introduction-to-

Now we type "c":

 firefox introduction-to-c

After pressing Tab ↹ it will be completed to the whole filename:

 firefox introduction-to-command-line-completion.html

In short we typed:

 firTab ↹iTab ↹cTab ↹

This is just eight keystrokes, which is considerably less than 52 keystrokes we would have needed to type without using command-line completion.

=== Rotating completion ===
The following example shows how command-line completion works with rotating completion, such as Windows's CMD uses.

We follow the same procedure as for prompting completion until we have:

 firefox i

We press Tab ↹ once, with the result:

 firefox introduction-to-bash.html

We press Tab ↹ again, getting:

 firefox introduction-to-command-line-completion.html

In short we typed:

 firTab ↹iTab ↹Tab ↹

This is just seven keystrokes, comparable to prompting-style completion. This works best if we know what possibilities the interpreter will rotate through.

== Completion in different command line interfaces ==
- Unix shells, including Bash (the default shell in most Linux distributions) and ksh among many others, have a long-standing tradition of advanced and customizable completion capabilities.
  - Bash programmable completion, complete and compgen commands have been available since the beta version of 2.04 in 2000 and offers at least Pathname and filename completion.
  - For KornShell users, file name completion depends on the value of the EDITOR variable. If EDITOR is set to vi, you type part of the name, and then Escape,\. If EDITOR is set to Emacs, you type part of the name, and then Escape,Escape.
  - The Z shell (zsh) pioneered the support for fully programmable completion, allowing users to have the shell automatically complete the parameters of various commands unrelated to the shell itself, which is accomplished by priming the shell with definitions of all known switches as well as appropriate parameter types. This allows the user to e.g. type tar xzf Tab ↹ and have the shell complete only tarred gzip archives from the actual filesystem, skipping files which are incompatible with the input parameters. A modern zsh installation comes with completion definitions for over five hundred commands.
  - Tcsh offers default file, command, and variable name completion activated using Tab ↹. The 'complete' builtin command provides fully programmable completion. The source code comes with a 'complete.tcsh' file containing many examples of its completion syntax.
- Windows PowerShell, the extensible command shell from Microsoft, which is based on object-oriented programming and the Microsoft .NET framework, provides powerful and customizable completion capabilities similar to those of traditional Unix shells.
- The cmd.exe command processor of Windows NT-based systems supports basic completion. It is possible to use a separate key-binding for matching directory names only.
- cmd.exe /F:ON enables file and directory name completion characters (^F and ^D by default). Use cmd.exe /? for more information.
- TweakUI can be used to configure the keys used for file name and directory name completion.
- The MS-DOS command processor COMMAND.COM did not have command-line completion: pressing the tab key would just advance the cursor. However, various enhanced shells for MS-DOS, such as 4DOS, the FreeDOS version of COMMAND.COM, or the Enhanced DOSKEY.COM feature Unix-style tab completion.
- Far Manager apart from its file management functions provides command history and line completion for Windows.

== See also ==
- Autocomplete
- Command-line interface
- Comparison of command shells
- Shell
