= Fish (Unix shell) =

User-friendly interactive Unix shell

fish
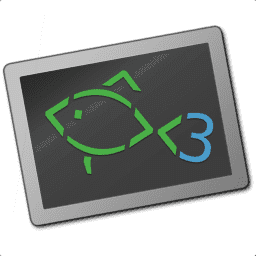

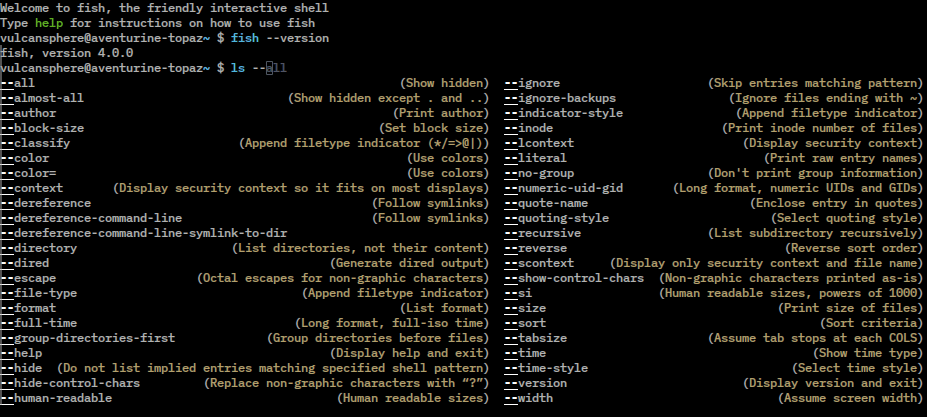
- Version 4.0.0 of fish
- Original author: Axel Liljencrantz
- Developer: Fish-shell developers
- Release: 13 February 2005; 21 years ago
- Stable release: 4.9.3 / 8 September 2026
- Written in: Rust since v4.0, C++ up to v3.7.1 C up to 1.8
- Operating system: Unix-like
- Type: Unix shell
- License: GPL-2.0-only
- Website: fishshell.com
- Repository: github.com/fish-shell/fish-shell

fish (friendly interactive shell; stylized in lowercase) is a Unix-like shell with a focus on interactivity and usability. fish is designed to be feature-rich by default, rather than highly configurable, and does not adhere to POSIX shell standards by design.

== Features ==
fish displays incremental suggestions as the user types, based on command history and the current directory. This functions similarly to Bash's Ctrl+R history search, but is always on, giving the user continuous feedback while typing commands. fish also includes feature-rich tab completion, with support for expanding file paths (with wildcards and brace expansion), environment variables, and command-specific completions. Command-specific completions, including options with descriptions, can be to some extent generated from the commands' man pages, but custom completions can also be included with software or written by users of the shell.

The creator of fish preferred to add new features as commands rather than syntax. This made features more discoverable, as the built-in features allow searching commands with options and help texts. Functions can also include human readable descriptions. A special help command gives access to all the fish documentation in the user's web browser.

== Syntax ==
The syntax resembles a POSIX compatible shell (such as Bash), but deviates in many ways

# Variable assignment
#
# Set the variable 'foo' to the value 'bar'.
# fish doesn't use the = operator, which is inherently whitespace sensitive.
# The 'set' command extends to work with arrays, scoping, etc.

> set foo bar
> echo $foo
bar

# Command substitution
#
# Assign the output of the command 'pwd' into the variable 'wd'.
# fish doesn't use backticks (``), which can't be nested and may be confused with single quotes (' ').

> set wd (pwd)
> set wd $(pwd) # since version 3.4
> echo $wd
~

# Array variables. 'A' becomes an array with 5 values:
> set A 3 5 7 9 12
# Array slicing. 'B' becomes the first two elements of 'A':
> set B $A[1 2]
> echo $B
3 5
# You can index with other arrays and even command
# substitution output:
> echo $A[(seq 3)]
3 5 7
# Erase the third and fifth elements of 'A'
> set --erase A[$B]
> echo $A
3 5 9

# for-loop, convert jpegs to pngs
> for i in *.jpg
      convert $i (basename $i .jpg).png
  end

# fish supports multi-line history and editing.
# Semicolons work like newlines:
> for i in *.jpg; convert $i (basename $i .jpg).png; end

# while-loop, read lines /etc/passwd and output the fifth
# colon-separated field from the file. This should be
# the user description.
> while read line
      set arr (echo $line|tr : \n)
      echo $arr[5]
  end < /etc/passwd

# String replacement (replacing all i by I)
> string replace -a "i" "I" "Wikipedia"
WIkIpedIa

=== No implicit subshell ===
Some language constructs, like pipelines, functions and loops, have been implemented using so called subshells in other shell languages. Subshells are child programs that run a few commands to perform a task, then exit back to the parent shell. This implementation detail typically has the side effect that any state changes made in the subshell, such as variable assignments, do not propagate to the main shell. fish never creates subshells for language features; all builtins happen within the parent shell.

# This will not work in many other shells, since the 'read' builtin
# will run in its own subshell. In Bash, the right side of the pipe
# can't have any side effects. In ksh, the below command works, but
# the left side can't have any side effects. In fish and zsh, both
# sides can have side effects.
> cat *.txt | read line

==== Variable assignment example ====
This Bash example doesn't do what it seems: because the loop body is a subshell, the update to $found is not persistent.

found=''
cat /etc/fstab | while read dev mnt rest; do
  if test "$mnt" = "/"; then
    found="$dev"
  fi
done

Workaround:

found=''
while read dev mnt rest; do
  if test "$mnt" = "/"; then
    found="$dev"
  fi
done < /etc/fstab

Fish example:

set found ''
cat /etc/fstab | while read dev mnt rest
  if test "$mnt" = "/"
    set found $dev
  end
end

== Universal variables ==
fish has a feature known as universal variables, which allows a user to permanently assign a value to a variable across all the user's running fish shells. The variable value is remembered across logouts and reboots, and updates are immediately propagated to all running shells.

# This will make emacs the default text editor. The '--universal' (or '-U') tells fish to
# make this a universal variable.
> set --universal EDITOR emacs

# This command will make the current working directory part of the fish
# prompt turn blue on all running fish instances.
> set --universal fish_color_cwd blue

== Other features ==
- Advanced tab completion (with support for writing custom completions).
- Syntax highlighting with extensive error checking.
- Support for the X clipboard.
- Smart terminal handling based on terminfo.
- Searchable command history.
- Web-based configuration (fish_config).

== Bash/fish translation table ==
Feature	Bash syntax	fish syntax	Comment
variable expansion: with word splitting and glob interpretation	$var or ${var[@]} or ${var[*]}	deliberately omitted	Identified as a primary cause of bugs in posix compatible shell languages
variable expansion: scalar	"$var"	deliberately omitted	Every variable is an array
variable expansion: array	"${var[@]}"	$var	Quoting not necessary to suppress word splitting and glob interpretation. Instead, quoting signifies serialization.
variable expansion: as a space separated string	"${var[*]}"	"$var"	Quoting not necessary to suppress word splitting and glob interpretation. Instead, quoting signifies serialization.
edit line in text editor	Ctrl+X,Ctrl+E	Alt+E	Upon invocation, moves line input to a text editor
evaluate line input	Ctrl+Alt+E	—N/a	Evaluates expressions in-place on the line editor
history completion	Ctrl+R	implicit	
history substitution	!!	deliberately omitted	Not discoverable
explicit subshell	(expression)	fish -c expression	
command substitution	"$(expression)"	"$(expression)" or (expression | string collect)	
process substitution	<(expression)	(expression | psub)	Command, not syntax
logical operators	!cmd && echo FAIL || echo OK	not command and echo FAIL or echo OK	Command, not syntax
variable assignment	var=value	set var value	Command, not syntax
string processing: replace	"${HOME/alice/bob}"	string replace alice bob $HOME	Command, not syntax
string processing: remove prefix or suffix pattern, non-greedily or greedily	var=a.b.c "${var#*.}"  #b.c "${var##*.}" #c "${var%.*}"  #a.b "${var%%.*}" #a	string replace --regex '.*?\.(.*)' '$1' a.b.c #b.c string replace --regex '.*\.(.*)' '$1' a.b.c  #c string replace --regex '(.*)\..*' '$1' a.b.c  #a.b string replace --regex '(.*?)\..*' '$1' a.b.c #a	Command, not syntax
export variable	export var	set --export var	Options discoverable via tab completion
function-local variable	local var	by default	Options discoverable via tab completion
scope-local variable	no equivalent	set --local var	Options discoverable via tab completion
remove variable	unset var	set --erase var	Options discoverable via tab completion
check if a variable exists	test -v var	set --query var	Options discoverable via tab completion
array initialization	var=( a b c )	set var a b c	Every variable is an array
array iteration	for i in "${var[@]}"; do   echo "$i" done	for i in $var   echo $i end	Every variable is an array
argument vector: all arguments	"$@"	$argv	Every variable is an array
argument vector: indexing	"$1"	$argv[1]	Every variable is an array
argument vector: length	$#	(count $argv)	Every variable is an array
argument vector: shift	shift	set --erase argv[1]	Every variable is an array
array representation in environment variables	PATH="$PATH:$HOME/.local/bin"	set PATH $PATH $HOME/.local/bin	fish assumes colon as array delimiter for translating variables to and from the environment. This aligns with many array-like environment variables, like $PATH and $LS_COLORS.
export and run	LANG=C.UTF-8 python3	env LANG=C.UTF-8 python3	env LANG=C.UTF-8 python3 works in any shell, as env is a standalone program.
arithmetic	$((10/3))	math '10/3'	expr 10 / 3 works in any shell, as expr is a standalone program.
escape sequence	$'\e'	\e	printf '\e' works in both shells; their printf builtins are both compatible with the GNU printf standalone program.
single quoted string: escape sequences	'mom'\''s final backslash: \'	'mom\'s final backslash: \\'	Bash only requires replacement of the single quote itself in single quoted strings, but the replacement is 4 characters long. The same replacement works in fish, but fish supports a regular escape sequence for this, thus requires escaping backslashes too (except permits single backslashes that don't precede another backslash or single quote).

== See also ==
- Comparison of command shells
- Unix
