= Unix shell =

Command-line interpreter for Unix operating system

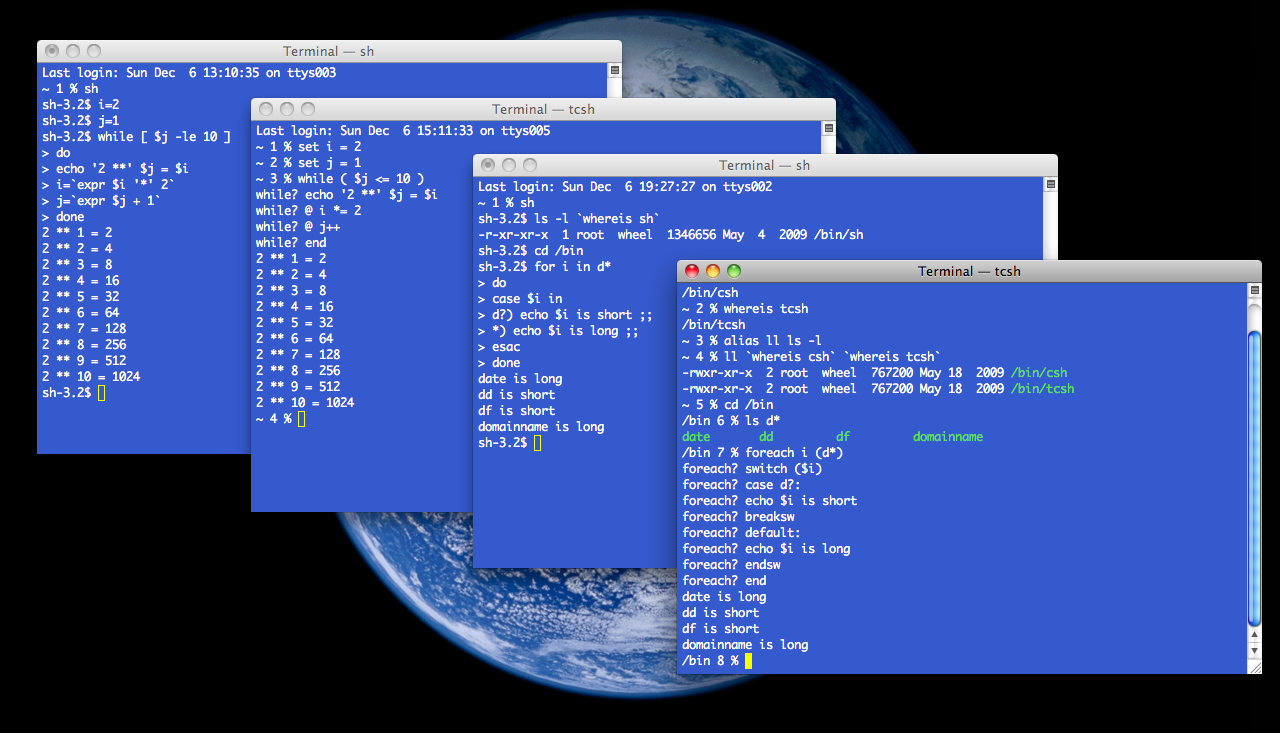
tcsh and sh shell windows on a Mac OS X Leopard desktop

A Unix shell is a shell that provides a command-line user interface for a Unix-like operating system. A Unix shell provides a command language that can be used either interactively or for writing a shell script. A user typically works within a Unix shell via a terminal emulator; however, direct access via serial hardware connections or a Secure Shell are common for server systems. Although use of a Unix shell is popular with some users, others prefer to use a graphical shell in a windowing system, such as those provided in desktop Linux distributions or macOS, instead of a command-line interface (CLI).

A user may have access to multiple Unix shells with one configured to run by default when the user logs in interactively. The default selection is typically stored in a user's profile (for example, in the local passwd file or in a distributed configuration system such as NIS or LDAP). A user may use other shells nested inside the default shell.

A Unix shell may provide many features including: variable definition and substitution, command substitution, filename wildcarding, stream piping, control flow structures (condition-testing and iteration), working directory context, and here document.

== History ==
=== Early shells ===
The first Unix shell was the Thompson shell, sh, written by Ken Thompson at Bell Labs and distributed with Versions 1 through 6 of Unix, from 1971 to 1975. Though rudimentary by modern standards, it introduced many of the basic features common to all later Unix shells, including piping, simple control structures using if and goto, and filename GLOBbing. Though not in current use, it is still available as part of some Ancient UNIX systems, such as Version 6 Unix.

It was modeled after the Multics shell, developed in 1965 by American software engineer Glenda Schroeder. Schroeder's Multics shell was itself modeled after the RUNCOM program Louis Pouzin showed to the Multics Team. The "rc" suffix on some Unix configuration files (e.g. ".bashrc" or ".vimrc"), is a remnant of the RUNCOM ancestry of Unix shells.

The PWB shell or Mashey shell, sh, was an upward-compatible version of the Thompson shell, augmented by John Mashey and others and distributed with the Programmer's Workbench UNIX, circa 1975–1977. It focused on making shell programming practical, especially in large shared computing centers. It added shell variables (precursors of environment variables, including the search path mechanism that evolved into $PATH), user-executable shell scripts, and interrupt-handling. Control structures were extended from if/goto to if/then/else/endif, switch/breaksw/endsw, and while/end/break/continue. As shell programming became widespread, these external commands were incorporated into the shell itself for performance.

But the most widely distributed and influential of the early Unix shells were the Bourne shell and the C shell. Both shells have been used as the coding base and model for many derivative and work-alike shells with extended feature sets.

=== Bourne shell ===
The Bourne shell, sh, was a new Unix shell by Stephen Bourne at Bell Labs. Distributed as the shell for UNIX Version 7 in 1979, it introduced the rest of the basic features considered common to all the later Unix shells, including here documents, command substitution, more generic variables and more extensive builtin control structures. The language, including the use of a reversed keyword to mark the end of a block, was influenced by ALGOL 68. Traditionally, the Bourne shell program name is sh and its path in the Unix file system hierarchy is /bin/sh. But a number of compatible work-alikes are also available with various improvements and additional features. On many systems, sh may be a symbolic link or hard link to one of these alternatives:

- Almquist shell (ash): written as a BSD-licensed replacement for the Bourne Shell; often used in resource-constrained environments. The sh of FreeBSD, NetBSD (and their derivatives) are based on ash that has been enhanced to be POSIX conformant.
  - Busybox: a set of Unix utilities for small and embedded systems, which includes 2 shells: ash, a derivative of the Almquist shell; and hush, an independent implementation of a Bourne shell.
  - Debian Almquist shell (dash): a modern replacement for ash in Debian and Ubuntu
- Bourne-Again shell (bash): written as part of the GNU Project to provide a superset of Bourne Shell functionality. This shell can be found installed and is the default interactive shell for users on most Linux systems; it provides both interactive mode (implemented by GNU Readline) or script-mode.
- Korn shell (ksh): an enhanced version of the Bourne shell, written by David Korn based on the Bourne shell sources while working at Bell Labs
- Public domain Korn shell (pdksh)
  - MirBSD Korn shell (mksh): a descendant of the OpenBSD /bin/ksh and pdksh, developed as part of MirOS BSD
- Z shell (zsh): a relatively modern shell that is partially backward compatible with bash. It's the default shell in Kali Linux since 2020.4 and macOS since 10.15 Catalina.

The POSIX standard specifies its standard shell as a strict subset of the Korn shell. From a user's perspective the Bourne shell was immediately recognized when active by its characteristic default command line prompt character, the dollar sign ($).

=== C shell ===
The C shell, csh, was modeled on the C programming language, including the control structures and the expression grammar. It was written by Bill Joy as a graduate student at University of California, Berkeley, and was widely distributed with BSD Unix.

The C shell also introduced many features for interactive work, including the history and editing mechanisms, aliases, directory stacks, tilde notation, cdpath, job control and path hashing. On many systems, csh may be a symbolic link or hard link to TENEX C shell (tcsh), an improved version of Joy's original version. Although the interactive features of csh have been copied to most other shells, the language structure has not been widely copied. The only work-alike is Hamilton C shell, written by Nicole Hamilton, first distributed on OS/2 in 1988 and on Windows since 1992.

== Configuration files ==
Shells read configuration files in various circumstances. These files usually contain commands for the shell and are executed when loaded; they are usually used to set important variables used to find executables, like $PATH, and others that control the behavior and appearance of the shell. The table in this section shows the configuration files for popular shells.

Configuration file	sh	ksh	csh	tcsh	bash	zsh
/etc/.login			login	login		
/etc/csh.cshrc			yes	yes		
/etc/csh.login			login	login		
~/.tcshrc				yes		
~/.cshrc			yes	yes (Note: only if ~/.tcshrc not found)		
/etc/ksh.kshrc		int.				
/etc/sh.shrc	int. (Note: Newer versions of the Bourne Shell only)					
$ENV (typically ~/.kshrc)	int. (Note: Available on systems that support the "User Portability Utilities option"; value of the variable must be an absolute path, and it is ignored "if the user's real and effective user IDs or real and effective group IDs are different.") (Note: $ENV is $HOME/.shrc in newer versions of the Bourne Shell)	int.			int. (Note: Same behavior as sh, but only if invoked as sh (bash 2+) or, since bash 4.2, also if invoked explicitly in POSIX compatibility mode (with options --posix or -o posix).)	
~/.login			login	login		
~/.logout			login	login		
/etc/profile	login	login			login	login (Note: Only in sh/ksh compatibility mode (when invoked as bash, sh, ksh))
~/.profile	login	login			login (Note: The first readable file in order of ~/.bash_profile, ~/.bash_login and ~/.profile; and only ~/.profile if invoked as sh or, as of at least Bash 4.2, if invoked explicitly in POSIX compatibility mode (with options --posix or -o posix))	login
~/.bash_profile					login	
~/.bash_login					login	
~/.bash_logout					login	
~/.bashrc					int.+n/login	
/etc/zshenv						yes
/etc/zprofile						login
/etc/zshrc						int.
/etc/zlogin						login
/etc/zlogout						login
~/.zshenv						yes
~/.zprofile						login
~/.zshrc						int.
~/.zlogin						login
~/.zlogout						login

Explanation:

- blank means a file is not read by a shell at all.
- "yes" means a file is always read by a shell upon startup.
- "login" means a file is read if the shell is a login shell.
- "n/login" means a file is read if the shell is not a login shell.
- "int." means a file is read if the shell is interactive.

== Other shells ==
Variations on the Unix shell concept that don't derive from Bourne shell or C shell include the following:

- es – A functional programming rc-compatible shell written in the mid-1990s.
- Friendly interactive shell (fish) – First released in 2005.
- PowerShell – An object-oriented shell developed originally for Windows OS and now available to macOS and Linux.
- Qshell – A shell on the IBM i operating system based on POSIX and X/Open standards.
- rc – The default shell on Plan 9 from Bell Labs and Version 10 Unix written by Tom Duff. Ports have been made to various Unix-like operating systems.
- scsh – A Scheme Shell.
- wish – A windowing shell for Tcl/Tk.

== See also ==
- Comparison of command shells
- List of POSIX commands
- Read–eval–print loop – Computer programming environment
- Restricted shell
- Shell account – User account on a remote server
- Shell script – Script written for an operating system shell
- Shell shoveling – Computer network security concept
