= Bourne shell =

Command-line interpreter for operating systems

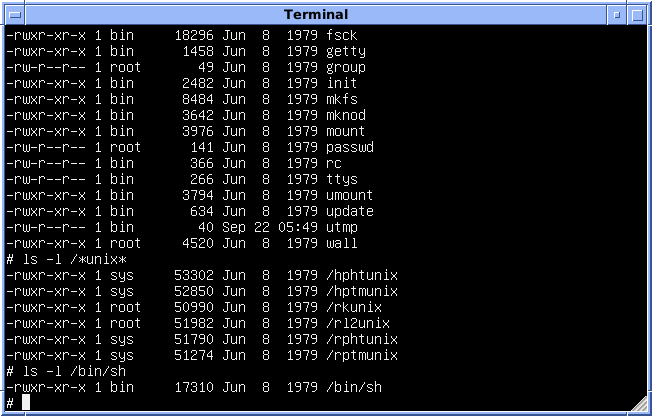
- Bourne shell interaction on Version 7 Unix
- Original author: Stephen Bourne
- Developer: Bell Telephone Laboratories
- Release: 1979; 47 years ago
- Operating system: Unix
- Type: Unix shell
- License: Varies by branch and release: As part of AT&T Unix: proprietary; As part of an 2002 release of historical Unix code: Caldera historic UNIX license; As part of OpenSolaris and later Schilly-Tools: CDDL

The Bourne shell (sh) is a shell command-line interpreter for computer operating systems. It first appeared on Version 7 Unix, as its default shell. Unix-like systems continue to have /bin/sh—which will be the Bourne shell, or a symbolic link or hard link to a compatible shell—even when other shells are used by most users.

The Bourne shell was once standard on all branded Unix systems, although historically BSD-based systems had many scripts written in csh. As the basis of POSIX sh syntax, Bourne shell scripts can typically be run with Bash or dash on Linux or other Unix-like systems; Bash itself is a free clone of Bourne.

== History ==
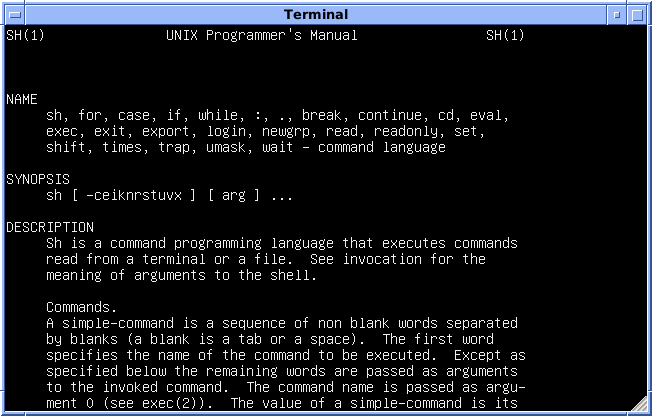
Version 7 Unix: the original Bourne shell manual page. PDP-11 simulation with SIMH

=== Origins ===
Work on the Bourne shell initially started in 1976. Developed by Stephen Bourne at Bell Labs, it was a replacement for the Thompson shell, whose executable file had the same name—sh. The Bourne shell was also preceded by the Mashey shell. Bourne was released in 1979 in the Version 7 Unix release distributed to colleges and universities. Although it is used as an interactive command interpreter, it was also intended as a scripting language and contains most of the features that are commonly considered to produce structured programs.

It gained popularity with the publication of The Unix Programming Environment by Brian Kernighan and Rob Pike—the first commercially published book that presented the shell as a programming language in a tutorial form.

Some of the primary goals of the shell were:

- To allow shell scripts to be used as filters
- To provide programmability including control flow and variables
- Control over all input/output file descriptors
- Control over signal handling within scripts
- No limits on string lengths when interpreting shell scripts
- Rationalize and generalize string quoting mechanism
- The environment mechanism. This allowed context to be established at startup and provided a way for shell scripts to pass context to sub scripts (processes) without having to use explicit positional parameters

=== Features of the original version ===
Features of the Version 7 UNIX Bourne shell include:

- Scripts can be invoked as commands by using their filename
- May be used interactively or non-interactively
- Allows both synchronous and asynchronous execution of commands
- Supports input and output redirection and pipelines
- Provides a set of built-in commands
- Provides flow control constructs and quotation facilities
- Typeless variables
- Provides local and global variable scope
- Scripts do not require compilation before execution
- Does not have a goto facility, so code restructuring may be necessary
- Command substitution using backquotes: `command`
- Here documents using << to embed a block of input text within a script
- for ~ do ~ done loops, in particular the use of $* to loop over arguments, as well as for ~ in ~ do ~ done loops for iterating over lists
- case ~ in ~ esac selection mechanism, primarily intended to assist argument parsing
- sh provided support for environment variables using keyword parameters and exportable variables
- Contains strong provisions for controlling input and output and in its expression matching facilities

The Bourne shell also was the first to feature the convention of using file descriptor 2> for error messages, allowing much greater programmatic control during scripting by keeping error messages separate from data.

==== Influence from Algol 68C ====
Stephen Bourne's coding style was influenced by his experience with the ALGOL 68C compiler that he had been working on at Cambridge University. In addition to the style in which the program was written, Bourne reused portions of ALGOL 68's if ~ then ~ elif ~ then ~ else ~ fi, case ~ in ~ esac and for/while ~ do ~ od (using done instead of od) clauses in the common Unix Bourne shell syntax. Moreover, although the v7 shell is written in C, Bourne took advantage of some macros to give the C source code an ALGOL 68 flavor. The resulting dialect of C has been nicknamed "Bournegol". A sample of "Bournegol" from cmd.c:

LOCAL TREPTR	term(flg)
{
	REG TREPTR	t;

	reserv++;
	IF flg&NLFLG
	THEN	skipnl();
	ELSE	word();
	FI

	IF (t=item(TRUE)) ANDF (wdval=='^' ORF wdval=='|')
	THEN	return(makelist(TFIL, makefork(FPOU,t), makefork(FPIN|FPCL,term(NLFLG))));
	ELSE	return(t);
	FI
}

These macros (along with the finger command distributed in Unix version 4.2BSD) inspired the International Obfuscated C Code Contest (IOCCC).

=== Features introduced after 1979 ===
Over the years, the Bourne shell was enhanced at AT&T. The various variants are thus called like the respective AT&T Unix version it was released with (some important variants being Version7, System III, SVR2, SVR3, SVR4). As the shell was never versioned, the only way to identify it was testing its features.

Features of the Bourne shell versions since 1979 include:

- Built-in test command – System III shell (1981)
- # as comment character – System III shell (1981)
- Colon in parameter substitutions "${parameter:=word}" – System III shell (1981)
- continue with argument – System III shell (1981)
- cat <<-EOF for indented here documents – System III shell (1981)
- Functions and the return builtin – SVR2 shell (1984)
- Built-ins unset, echo, type – SVR2 shell (1984)
- Source code de-ALGOL68-ized – SVR2 shell (1984)
- Modern "$@" – SVR3 shell (1986)
- Built-in getopts – SVR3 shell (1986)
- Cleaned up parameter handling allows recursively callable functions – SVR3 shell (1986)
- 8-bit clean – SVR3 shell (1986)
- Job control – SVR4 shell (1989)
- Multi-byte support – SVR4 shell (1989)

== Variants ==
=== DMERT shell ===
Duplex Multi-Environment Real-Time (DMERT) is a hybrid time-sharing/real-time operating system developed in the 1970s at Bell Labs Indian Hill location in Naperville, Illinois uses a 1978 snapshot of Bourne Shell "VERSION sys137 DATE 1978 Oct 12 22:39:57". The DMERT shell runs on 3B21D computers still in use in the telecommunications industry.

=== Korn shell ===
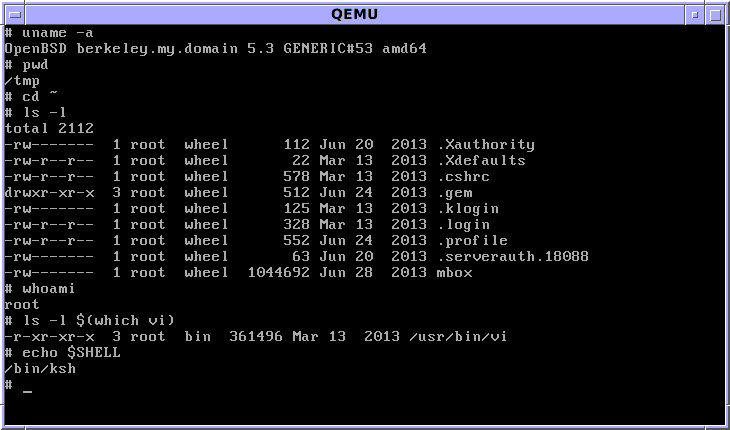
Interaction with pdksh in OpenBSD (default shell)

The Korn shell (ksh), written by David Korn based on the original Bourne Shell source code, was a middle road between the Bourne shell and the C shell. Its syntax was chiefly drawn from the Bourne shell, while its job control features resembled those of the C shell. The functionality of the original Korn Shell (known as ksh88 from the year of its introduction) was used as a basis for the POSIX shell standard. A newer version, ksh93, has been open source since 2000 and is used on some Linux distributions. A clone of ksh88 known as pdksh is the default shell in OpenBSD.

=== Schily Bourne Shell ===
Jörg Schilling's Schily-Tools includes three Bourne Shell derivatives.

== Relationship to other shells ==
=== C shell ===
Bill Joy, the author of the C shell, criticized the Bourne shell as being unfriendly for interactive use, a task for which Stephen Bourne himself acknowledged C shell's superiority. Bourne stated, however, that his shell was superior for scripting and was available on any Unix system, and Tom Christiansen also criticized C shell as being unsuitable for scripting and programming.

=== Almquist shells ===
Due to copyright issues surrounding the Bourne Shell as it was used in historic CSRG BSD releases, Kenneth Almquist developed a clone of the Bourne Shell, known by some as the Almquist shell and available under the BSD license, which is in use today on some BSD descendants and in low-memory situations. The Almquist Shell was ported to Linux, and the port renamed the Debian Almquist shell, or dash. This shell provides faster execution of standard sh (and POSIX-standard sh, in modern descendants) scripts with a smaller memory footprint than its counterpart, Bash. Its use tends to expose bashisms – bash-centric assumptions made in scripts meant to run on sh.

=== Other shells ===
- Bash (the Bourne-Again shell) was developed in 1989 for the GNU project and incorporates features from the Bourne shell, csh, and ksh. It is meant to be POSIX-compliant.
- rc was created at Bell Labs by Tom Duff as a replacement for sh for Version 10 Unix. It is the default shell for Plan 9 from Bell Labs. It has been ported to UNIX as part of Plan 9 from User Space.
- Z shell, developed by Paul Falstad in 1990, is an extended Bourne shell with a large number of improvements, including some features of Bash, ksh, and tcsh.

== See also ==
- Comparison of command shells
- Unix shell
