= Grml =

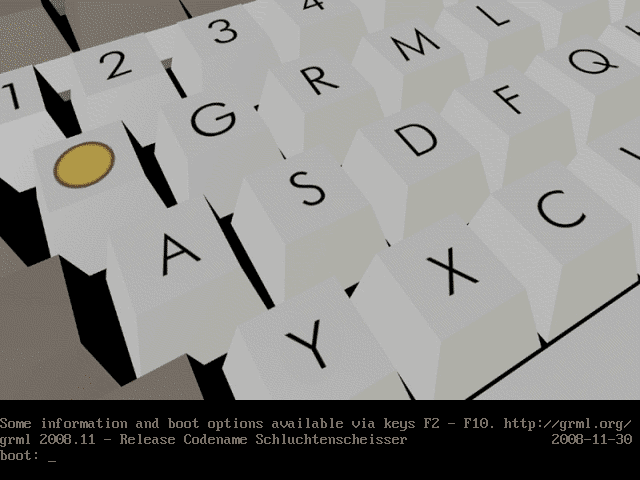
- Grml 2008.11 bootsplash
- Developer: Grml team and community
- OS family: Linux (Unix-like)
- Working state: Current
- Source model: Open source
- Initial release: October 22, 2004; 21 years ago
- Latest release: 2026.04 / 30 April 2026; 2 months ago
- Kernel type: Monolithic kernel
- License: various DFSG-free licenses, proprietary firmware
- Official website: grml.org

Grml /ˈɡrɛməl/ is a Linux distribution based on Debian. It is designed to run mainly from a live CD, but can be made to run from a USB flash drive. Grml aims to be well-suited to system administrators (sysadmins) and other users of text tools. It includes an X Window System server and a few minimalist window managers such as wmii, Fluxbox, and openbox to use the graphical programs like Mozilla Firefox which are included in the distribution.

== Features ==
In addition to the sysadmin tools, security and network related software, data recovery and forensic tools, editors, shells, and many text tools included with grml, the distribution focuses on accessibility by providing kernel support for speakup and software like brltty, emacspeak, and flite.

Another feature Grml is its use of the Z shell (zsh) as the default login shell. The customized zsh configuration used by Grml can be retrieved from the project's repository.

Since early 2009, Grml ISOs come with MirOS bsd4grml, a minimal MirOS BSD flavour. After the release of Grml “Lackdose-Allergie” 2009.05, daily ISOs and later releases, such as Grml “Hello-Wien” 2009.10, use the manifold-boot technology to provide ISOs that can be written directly to a USB stick, CF/SD card, hard disc, etc. and are immediately bootable. Since Grml 2010.12 the ISOLINUX loader is used in all cases by default, providing a consistent menu.

While Grml is primarily designed as a live CD image, it can also be run as a desktop operating system through its "persistent home" feature.
