= Tcsh =

Unix shell based on and compatible with the C shell

TENEX C Shell
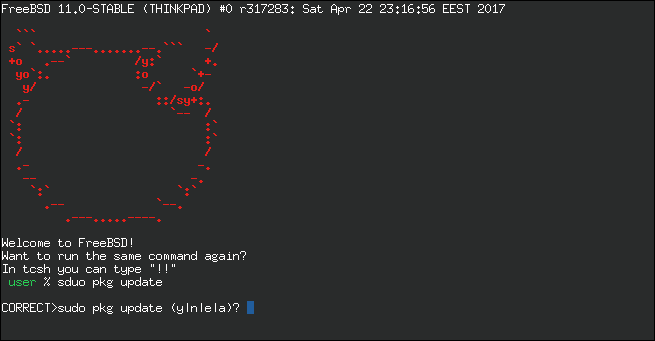
- Screenshot of a sample tcsh session
- Developers: Ken Greer, Paul Placeway, Christos Zoulas, et al.
- Stable release: 6.24.16 / 9 July 2025; 15 months ago
- Written in: C
- Operating system: Cross-platform
- Predecessor: C shell
- Type: Unix shell
- License: 2002: BSD-3-Clause; 1991: BSD-4-Clause
- Website: www.tcsh.org
- Repository: github.com/tcsh-org/tcsh

tcsh (/ˌtiːˈsiːʃɛl/ “tee-see-shell”, /ˈtiːʃɛl/ “tee-shell”, or as “tee see ess aitch”, tcsh) is a Unix shell based on and backward compatible with the C shell (csh).

== Shell ==
tcsh is essentially the C shell with programmable command-line completion, command-line editing, and a few other features. Unlike the other common shells, functions cannot be defined in a tcsh script and the user must use aliases instead (as in csh). It is the native root shell for some BSD-based systems, including FreeBSD 13 and earlier. (FreeBSD 14 changed the default root shell to sh to match the default user shell whereas OpenBSD uses the Korn shell ksh for both root and regular users.)

tcsh added filename and command completion and command line editing concepts borrowed from the TENEX operating system, which is the source of the “t”. Because it only added functionality and did not change what was there, tcsh remained backward compatible with the original C shell. Though it started as a side branch from the original csh source tree that Bill Joy had created, tcsh is now the main branch for ongoing development.

tcsh is very stable but new releases continue to appear roughly once a year, consisting mostly of minor bug fixes.

On many systems, such as macOS and Red Hat Linux, csh is actually tcsh. Often one of the two files is either a hard link or a symbolic link to the other, so that either name refers to the same improved version of the C shell (although behavior may be altered depending on which name is used).

On Debian and some derivatives (including Ubuntu), there are two different packages: csh and tcsh. The former is based on the original BSD version of csh and the latter is the improved tcsh.

== History ==
The “t” in tcsh comes from the “T” in TENEX, an operating system which inspired Ken Greer at Carnegie Mellon University, the author of tcsh, with its command-completion feature. Greer began working on his code to implement Tenex-style file name completion in September 1975, finally merging it into the C shell in December 1981. Mike Ellis at Fairchild A.I. Labs added command completion in September 1983. On October 3, 1983, Greer posted source to the net.sources newsgroup.

== Significant features ==
- Command history
  - The built-in history command displays the previously entered commands
  - Use of ↑ / ↓ at the command line to allow the user to select a command from the history to edit/execute
  - Invoking previous commands using command history
    - !! executes the previous command
    - !n executes the nth command that was previously executed
    - !-n executes the command that was executed n commands ago
    - !string executes the most recently executed command that starts with string
    - !?string executes the most recently executed command that contains string
  - Using history in new commands
    - !* - refers to all of the arguments from the previous command
    - !$ - refers to the last argument from the previous command
    - !^ - refers to the first argument from the previous command
    - !:n - refers to the n^{th} argument from the previous command
    - !:m-n - refers to the m^{th} through n^{th} arguments from the previous command
    - !:n-$ - refers to the n^{th} through the last argument from the previous command
- Command line editing
- Auto-completion of file names and variables as well as programmable completion at the command line
- Alias argument selectors; the ability to define an alias to take arguments supplied to it and apply them to the commands that it refers to. Tcsh is the only shell that provides this feature (in lieu of functions).
  - \!# - argument selector for all arguments, including the alias/command itself; arguments need not be supplied.
  - \!* - argument selector for all arguments, excluding the alias/command; arguments need not be supplied.
  - \!$ - argument selector for the last argument; argument need not be supplied, but if none is supplied, the alias name is considered to be the last argument.
  - \!^ - argument selector for first argument; argument MUST be supplied.
  - \!:n - argument selector for the n^{th} argument; argument MUST be supplied; n=0 refers to the alias/command name.
  - \!:m-n - argument selector for the arguments from the m^{th} to the n^{th}; arguments MUST be supplied.
  - \!:n-$ - argument selector for the arguments from the n^{th} to the last; at least argument n MUST be supplied.
  - \!:n* - argument selector for the arguments from the n^{th} to the last; sufficient arguments need not be supplied.
    #Alias the cd command so that when you change directories, the contents are immediately displayed.
alias cd 'cd \!* && ls'
- Wildcard matching
  if ( "$input" =~ [0-9]* ) then
  echo "the input starts with an integer"
else
  echo "the input does NOT start with an integer"
endif
- Job control
- The built-in where command. Works like the which command but shows all locations of the target command in the directories specified in $PATH rather than only the one that will be used.

== Deployment ==
tcsh has historically been in the default shell for FreeBSD and its descendants including DragonFly BSD and Mac OS X. However, as of July 2026, tcsh is no longer the default shell on FreeBSD since release 14.0. Prior to this release, tcsh had been the default shell of the root user, although it was not the default shell for unprivileged users. As of FreeBSD 14.0, the Almquist shell is used as the default shell for both privileged and unprivileged users. However, as of July 2026, FreeBSD continues to package tcsh in new installations by default.

Versions of Mac OS X prior to 10.3 provided tcsh as the default shell for user accounts, as a result of its nature as a descendant of FreeBSD. With the release of Mac OS X 10.3, the default user shell for new accounts was altered to be bash, and this default would continue until 10.15, where it was further altered to zsh.

== See also ==
- Comparison of command shells
