= David Korn (computer scientist) =

American computer programmer (born 1943)

- Born: August 28, 1943 (age 82); Brooklyn, New York, U.S.
- Occupation: Computer programmer

David Gerard Korn (August 28, 1943) is an American UNIX programmer and the author of the Korn shell (ksh), a command line interface/programming language.

== Education and work ==
David Korn received his undergraduate degree in mathematics from Rensselaer Polytechnic Institute in 1965 and his Ph.D. in applied mathematics from NYU's Courant Institute of Mathematical Sciences in 1969. After working on computer simulations of transsonic airfoils and developing the Korn airfoil, he switched fields to computer science and became a member of technical staff at Bell Laboratories in 1976. He developed Korn shell in response to problems he and his colleagues had with the most commonly used shells at the time, Bourne shell and C shell. The Korn shell pioneered the practice of consultative user interface design, with input from Unix shell users, and from mathematical and cognitive psychologists. The user interface, which included a choice of editing styles (the choices included styles based on vi and on two variants of Emacs) was incorporated into, or copied by, most subsequent Unix shells. The Korn shell is backward-compatible with Bourne shell, but takes a lot of ideas from C shell, such as history viewing and vi-like command line editing.

== Korn shell and Microsoft ==
Microsoft once included a version of the Korn shell produced by Mortice Kern Systems (MKS) in a UNIX integration package for Windows NT. This version was not compatible with ksh88 (a Korn shell specification), and Korn mentioned this during a question and answer period of a Microsoft presentation during a USENIX NT conference in Seattle in 1998. Greg Sullivan, a Microsoft product manager who was participating in the presentation, not knowing who the commenter was, insisted that Microsoft had indeed chosen a "real" Korn shell. A polite debate ensued, with Sullivan continuing to insist that the man giving the criticisms was mistaken about the compatibility issues. Sullivan only backed down when an audience member stood up and mentioned that the man making the comments was none other than the eponymous David Korn.

== Other software projects ==
Along with Korn shell, he is also known as the creator of UWIN, an X/Open library for Win32 systems, similar to the later Cygwin. Korn and Kiem-Phong Vo also co-developed sfio, a C library for managing I/O streams.

Korn became a Bell Labs fellow in 1984. He currently lives in New York City, and until 2013 worked for AT&T Labs Research in Florham Park, New Jersey, and he retired from Google in early February 2018.

== Family ==
His parents were Florence and Nathaniel Korn. The Korn family moved to Monroe in 1947 where they raised five children.

In 1967 he married Susan Lyn Weiner.

David Korn's son Adam used to work at Goldman Sachs.
