= Elizabeth Computer Centre =

Early school computing centre in Tasmania

The Elizabeth Computer Centre was a Tasmanian Education Department innovation established in 1975 to support computer education in Tasmania, Australia. The Centre was significant in developing one of the earliest Wide Area Networks (WAN) dedicated to educational purposes, known as TASNET, that connected all government schools in Tasmania. It was also significant in introducing the Logo programming language and the associated robotic Turtle to Australia, and developing the First Fleet Database which was distributed to all Australian schools in 1982. The Centre operated until 1991, after which the educational computing support role was absorbed into the Department of Education's Curriculum Branch.

== TASNET ==
TASNET and the Elizabeth Computer Centre were initially a project of Elizabeth Matriculation College (EMC), initiated by Scott Brownell, a Mathematics and Science teacher at the College. Its purpose was supporting students and teachers of the fledgling Computer Studies course.

In 1970, Brownell introduced his Year 12 mathematics students to computer programming using the ALGOL language. Students wrote their programs on mark sense cards. The cards were then physically taken to the University of Tasmania in Sandy Bay, 6km away from the College, to be batch processed overnight on the University's Elliot 503 computer. The inefficiency of physically taking cards to the University prompted Brownell to arrange the loan of a Digital PDP-8 minicomputer from the Tasmanian College of Advanced Education. This minicomputer was installed at Elizabeth Matriculation College. The cards could then be directly processed on-site.

In 1972, Computer Studies was introduced in Tasmania as a formal subject at Higher School Certificate level (Years 11 and 12). Tasmania was the first state in Australia to have such a subject. 70 students were enrolled across Elizabeth Matriculation College and Hobart Matriculation College.

During 1972, five terminals were linked to the PDP-8, four at EMC and one at Hobart Matriculation College (HMC), at Mt Nelson. A network, TASNET, had started.

In 1973, the Education Department purchased a PDP-11/20 computer to enable HMC to join the network. Computer Studies was also offered to students in the north of the state but only through batch processing. To support students in the north of the state, mark sense cards were collected from the northern colleges and sent to Hobart by bus each day. They were collected from the bus, processed overnight, and the results sent back by mail the next day. Sandra Wills, a university student who had been in the first intake of Computer Studies, was employed to undertake this work which continued until 1975 when it was no longer necessaary due north of the state being connected to TASNET.

In 1975, Launceston Matriculation College was provided with a PDP-11/20, Don College in Devonport with a PDP8 and Hellyer College in Burnie with a PDP-8. These three nodes were linked to the central PDP-11/40 computer at Elizabeth Computer Centre via multiplexing software.

By late1977, the statewide network had expanded to eighty terminals on 34 sites connected to two Digital PDP11/70 computers at ECC, via a network of five PDP-8 computers. The PDP-8s acted as terminal concentrators to the central ECC computers and were located in Devonport, Burnie, Launceston and Hobart. This system allowed schools anywhere in the state to connect on-line terminals to their nearest PDP-8 node.

By the end of 1980 TASNET had developed into a large distributed processing network supporting more than 200 terminals connected to six computers around the state. A PDP-8 computer had been installed at Murray High School in Queenstown since 1977 and upgrades had occurred to others giving a mix of two PDP 11/70s, two PDP 11/34s, and two PDP-8s, and a VAX 11/780 for administrative systems. By this time all secondary and technical colleges, most high schools, several district schools, one primary school as well as Education Department offices had permanent interactive access to the computers. The computers were being used in schools for the teaching of computer studies and related subjects, as well as being used for routine adminstrative tasks.

Tasmania pioneered the network approach to computers in education. By 1980 Western Australia and the ACT were developing similar facilities but in the larger population states there was no co-ordinating authority advising schools interested in computing.

In 1984 TASNET became an AUSTPAC host, allowing users to access databases throughout the world. Remote schools gained access to TASNET via AUSTPAC for local call charges.

== Branch of Tasmanian Education Department ==
The Elizabeth Computer Centre (ECC) was formally established as a branch of the Education Department in 1975 to operate TASNET and provide an advisory, co-ordination and administration role for computer education in Tasmania. ECC was physically located in temporary demountable buildings on the campus of Elizabeth Matriculation College in Elizabeth Street Hobart. Over the next 16 years, the Centre added to its primary role of supporting a wide range of classroom-based activities. It grew to provide services to all parts of the Education Department including central and school administration. In 1990 ECC moved to a purpose built building on the site of the newly constructed Claremont Education Park (later Claremont College).

== LOGO and Tasman Turtle project ==
In 1975, following a study trip to Massachusetts Institute of Technology in Boston, USA, Brownell brought a copy of the Logo programming language on magnetic tape to Tasmania. This was installed on the PDP-11 computer at ECC.

In 1976, Brownell and John Read obtained an innovations grant from the Australian Schools Commission to run a one-year project investigating the use of robotic Turtles to introduce programming concepts to primary school students. Wills returned to ECC to run the project which she did by travelling around the state to visit schools and work with teachers, with the equipment loaded into her car.

The LOGO project spearheaded the movement of computer education into primary schools and the growth of Computer Studies in High Schools.

The project attracted attention and many interstate visitors. The leadership and influence of the project was widely recognised.

When Seymour Papert visited Australia in 1981 to speak at a conference in Melbourne, he was apparently moved to tears when he found himself surrounded by a swarm of Tasman Turtles beeping and buzzing around him.

== Publications ==
- 1978-1980 Elizabeth Computer Centre Bulletin - one issue per school term
- 1981-1991 Classroom Computing - three issues yearly
