= Terminal mode =

Possible state of a terminal device in Unix-like systems

A terminal mode is one of a set of possible states of a terminal or pseudo terminal character device in Unix-like systems and determines how characters written to the terminal are interpreted. In cooked mode data is preprocessed before being given to a program, while raw mode passes the data as-is to the program without interpreting any of the special characters.

The system intercepts special characters in cooked mode and interprets special meaning from them. Backspace, delete, and Control-D are typically used to enable line-editing for the input to the running programs, and other control characters such as Control-C and Control-Z are used for job control or associated with other signals. The precise definition of what constitutes a cooked mode is operating system-specific.

For example, if "ABC<Backspace>D" is given as an input to a program through a terminal character device in cooked mode, the program gets "ABD". But, if the terminal is in raw mode, the program gets the characters "ABC" followed by the Backspace character and followed by "D". In cooked mode, the terminal line discipline processes the characters "ABC<Backspace>D" and presents only the result ("ABD") to the program.

Technically, the term cooked mode should be associated only with streams that have a terminal line discipline, but generally it is applied to any system that does some amount of preprocessing.

== cbreak mode ==
cbreak mode (sometimes called rare mode) is a mode between raw mode and cooked mode. Unlike cooked mode, it works with single characters at a time, rather than forcing a wait for a whole line and then feeding the line in all at once. Unlike raw mode, keystrokes like abort (usually Control-C) are still processed by the terminal and will interrupt the process.

== See also ==
- Terminal emulator
- Serial communications
- Command and Data modes
