= Mount Nelson Signal Station =

Coordinates: 42°55′27″S 147°20′39″E

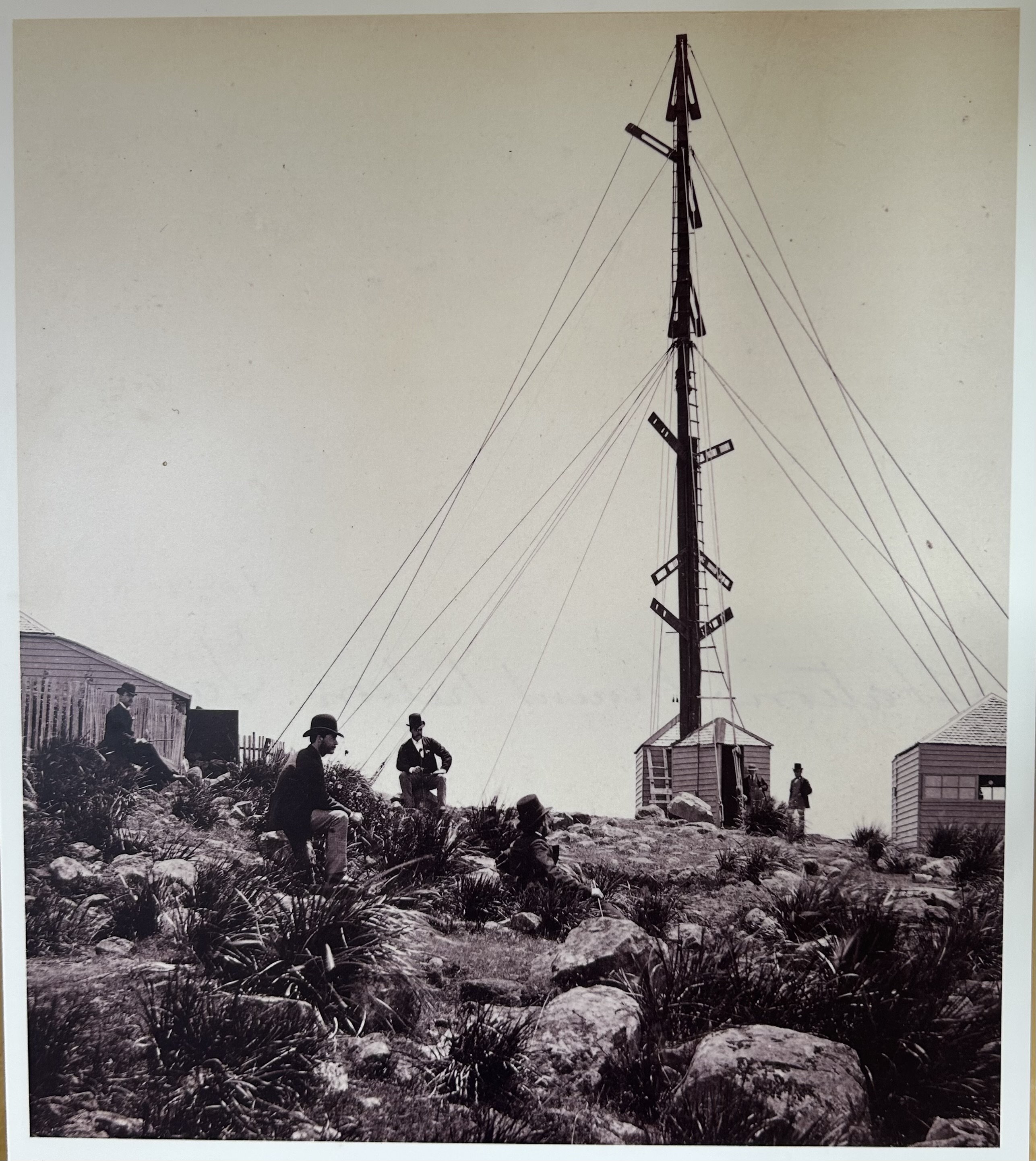
Mount Nelson Signal Station in the mid nineteenth century

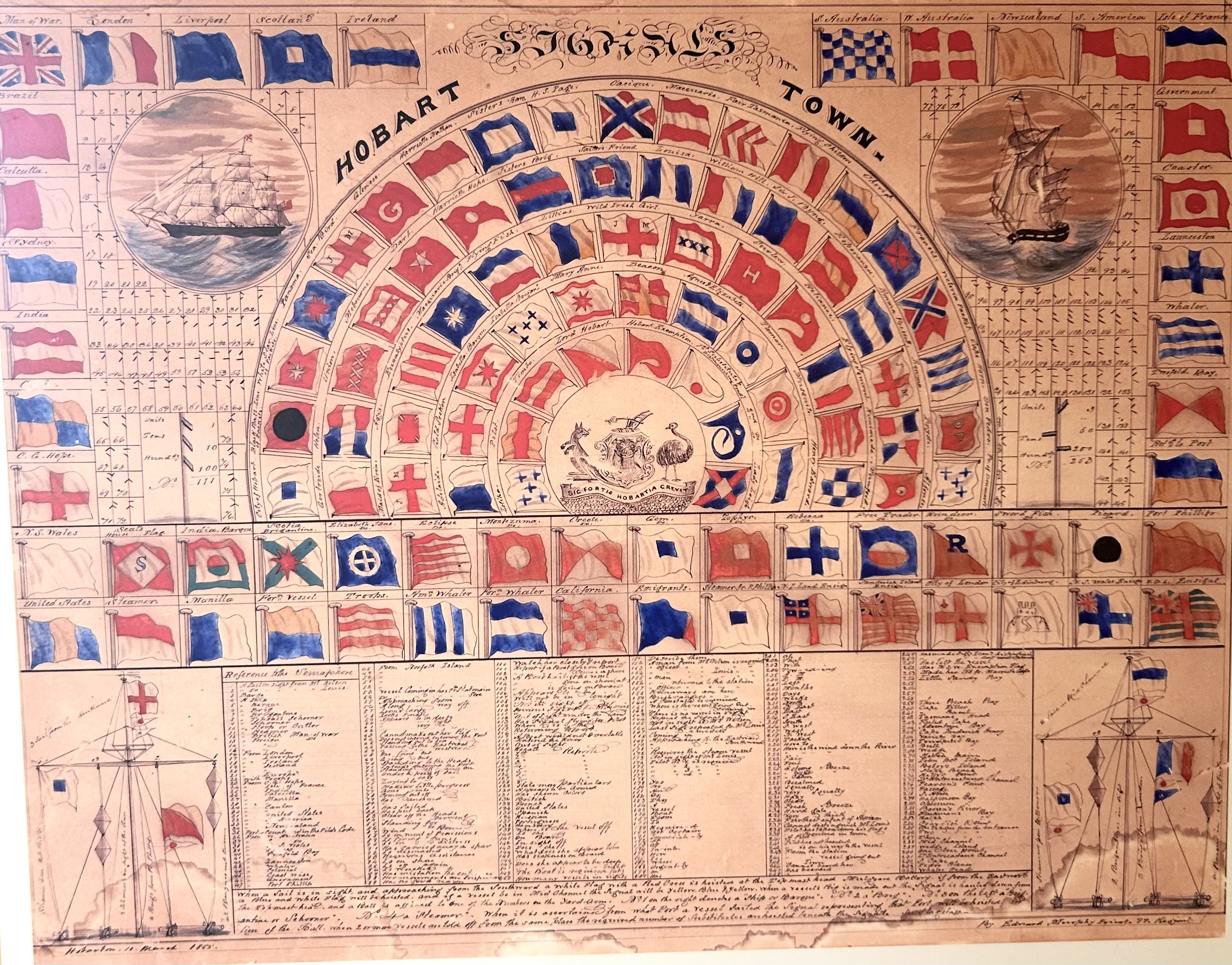
Page from semaphore code book used at Mount Nelson Signal Station

Mount Nelson Signal Station was the first signal station constructed in Tasmania and provided communication via flags and semaphore to Hobart and the penal settlement at Port Arthur.

== History ==
The signal station was built on Mount Nelson, Tasmania in 1811 on the orders of Governor Lachlan MacQuarie.

== The Signal ==
The original Mount Nelson Signal was a tall wooden mast with two arms at the top. Flags were attached by ropes to two arms, one above the other, each of which revolved. Ships entering the River Derwent displayed identifying flags which would be recognised by signal operators using binoculars.

By 1831, Mount Nelson operated a three-armed semaphore. This upright post with movable arms was capable of making 666 different code signals. In 1838, a replacement semaphore was set up standing over 24 metres high. This new signal mast boasted six arms and could handle over 900,000 separate signals. Signalling via semaphore continued at Mount Nelson until 1877.

The signals were sent to the Hobart semaphore at the Mulgrave Battery in Castray Esplanade in Battery Point. Another cruder system of semaphores at Mount Royal and Mount Lewis alerted the Mount Nelson station of shipping entering the River Derwent.

By 1836, the penal colony at Port Arthur needed to be informed of shipping movements and so the station at Mount Nelson was linked into the Tasman Peninsula semaphores. Messages could be sent to Hobart from the Port Arthur penal colony, alerting those in charge of the arrival of supplies, as well as giving advance warning of military threat and escapees.

Messages were sent by signallers who worked on three-hour watches between 6am and 9pm. They would raise and lower the arms of the semaphore according to a set code in order to transmit messages. It took about 15 minutes to send a 20-word message between Hobart and Port Arthur.

The signal station, which had until that point been operated by military personnel, was taken over by the Marine Board of Hobart in 1858. A new telescope was installed which could magnify over 30 times and which gave a view-range of 60 km.

The advent of the telephone meant that signal stations became obsolete, and in 1888, the signal station at Mount Nelson was dismantled.

The current signal is a replica. The nineteenth century signalman's house is now a restaurant, and there is a small display of flags and other artefacts.

Since 1979, the Mount Nelson site has been managed by Tasmania Parks and Wildlife Service.
