= Mount Nelson (mountain) =

Mountain in Tasmania, Australia

Highest point
- Elevation: 362 m (1,188 ft)
- Coordinates: 42°55′59.27″S 147°20′24.95″E

Naming
- Native name: Kriwalayti (Southeast Tasmanian)

Geography
- Location: Tasmania, Australia
- Parent range: Wellington Range

Geology
- Rock age: Jurassic
- Rock type: Dolerite

Climbing
- Easiest route: Southern Outlet, Proctors Road, Nelson Road or hike via Truganini Reserve

Mount Nelson (/maʊntˈnɛlsən/MOWNT-NEL-sən; Nuenonne/palawa kani: Kriwalayti) is a 362 m (1,188 ft) peak on the southern edge of Hobart, Tasmania. It is part of the Wellington Range and is notable for its views of the River Derwent, as well as its historical and cultural significance. The summit is home to the Mount Nelson Signal Station, established in 1811 to relay semaphore messages between Hobart and Port Arthur. It is also part of the Truganini Conservation Area, a key habitat for endangered species like the swift parrot, and features bushwalking trails through native forest.

== Geology ==
Mount Nelson is primarily composed of Jurassic dolerite, a coarse-grained igneous rock that forms much of Tasmania's mountainous terrain. This dolerite originated approximately 165 million years ago during the Jurassic period when extensive volcanic activity led to the intrusion of magma into the Earth's crust. The slow cooling of this magma beneath the surface created the characteristic columnar jointing and durable rock formations seen across the region, including at Mount Nelson.

The dolerite bedrock of Mount Nelson is part of the larger geological structure of the Wellington Range, which also includes nearby peaks like kunanyi / Mount Wellington. Over millions of years, erosion and weathering have shaped Mount Nelson's rounded profile and contributed to the development of nutrient-rich soils on its slopes.

The mountain's geological formations support diverse ecosystems, with variations in soil composition influencing the distribution of native vegetation. Additionally, the exposed dolerite outcrops and slopes provide insight into Tasmania's tectonic and volcanic history.

Mount Nelson’s geology is also notable for its connection to the extensive faulting and uplifting that shaped the broader Derwent estuary and surrounding landscapes. These processes exposed the dolerite intrusions that define the mountain’s rugged terrain today.

== History ==
The area now known as Mount Nelson lies within the traditional lands of the Muwinina, whose territory encompassed parts of present-day Hobart and its surrounding suburbs. The Muwinina, along with all Palawa/Pakana peoples, were profoundly impacted by the British colonisation of Lutruwita, then referred to by Europeans as Van Diemen’s Land. Beginning in 1803, colonisation led to widespread displacement and violence against the island's Indigenous population, culminating in what many historians recognise as a sanctioned genocide.

Amidst the Black War, colonial official and pastor George Augustus Robinson undertook an expedition to the island's northeast between 1830 and 1831, documenting indigenous languages and place names with the assistance of his Nuenonne guide, Wurati. During this journey, Wurati shared the term kriwalayti, from the Nuenonne language, which Robinson associated with Mount Nelson, visible from Bruny Island. The latter part of kriwalayti reflects a variation of a southeastern word meaning 'hill,' 'mountain,' or 'peak,' consistent with other local toponyms. The Nuenonne people of Bruny Island and the Muwinina people of greater Hobart belonged to the broader southeastern language group, highlighting the cultural and linguistic connections within the region. The name kriwalayti has since been incorporated into the reconstructed palawa kani language by contemporary Palawa peoples.

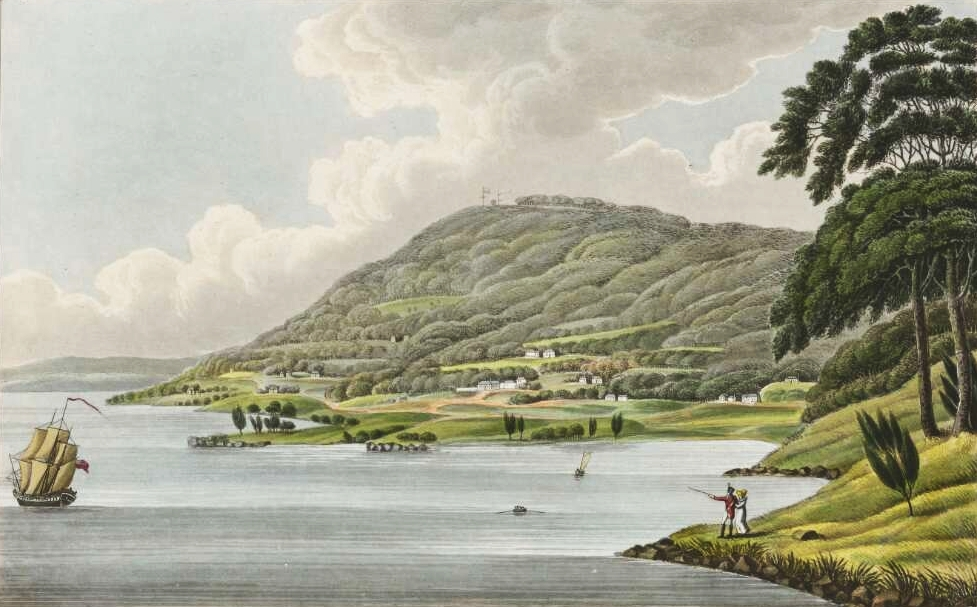
Painting of Mount Nelson by Joseph Lycett (1825)

=== British naming ===
Mount Nelson was named in 1811 by Governor Lachlan Macquarie, in honour of the brig HMS Lady Nelson, which played a significant role in the early European exploration and settlement of Van Diemen’s Land. The Lady Nelson was part of the fleet that brought the first British settlers to Hobart in 1803, and Macquarie himself travelled aboard the vessel during his 1811 visit to the colony.

Despite common misconceptions, the mountain was not named after British admiral Lord Nelson, known for his victory at the Battle of Trafalgar.

Another myth attributes the naming to Captain William Bligh during his 1788 voyage aboard the HMS Bounty, suggesting it was in honour of his botanist, David Nelson. This claim has appeared in local histories and tourism materials. The presence of Bligh Court and Christian Street off Nelson Road in the suburb of Mount Nelson, which may reference figures from the Bounty voyage, appears to have contributed to the persistence of this misconception.

== Signal Station ==
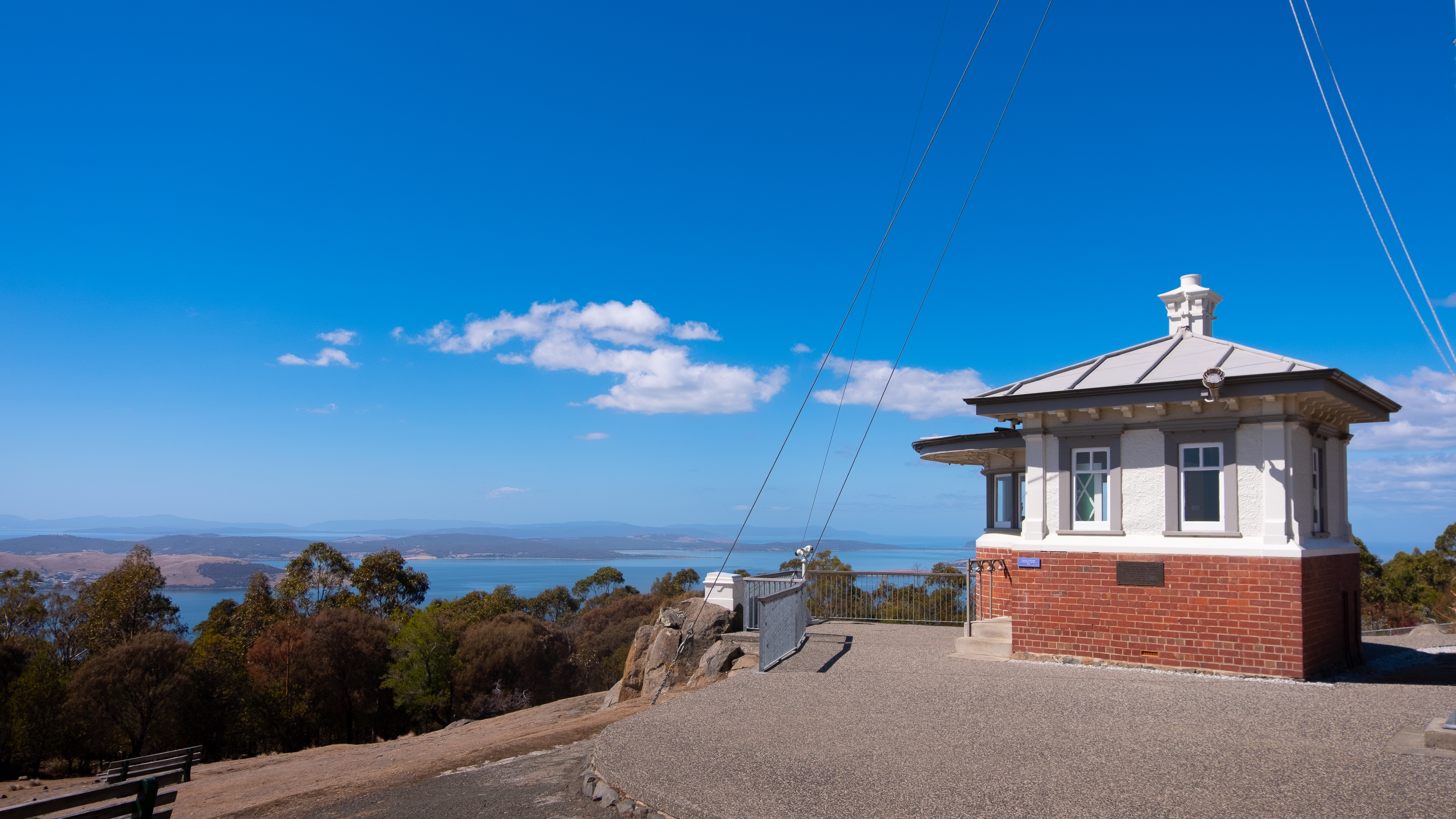
Mount Nelson Signal Station vista

Governor Lachlan Macquarie's visit to Van Diemen's Land in 1811 led to the establishment of a signal post atop Mount Nelson. This post served to announce the arrival of ships entering the estuary. The semaphore technology at the signal station became obsolete with the introduction of Tasmania's inaugural telephone line in 1880, linking the Mount Nelson signal station to the Hobart telegraph office. Adjacent to the Signal Station stands the Signal Station Brasserie, housed in the original head signalman’s residence built in 1897.

Historically, signalling operations evolved from flag-based systems to semaphores, with a notable upgrade in 1838 to a towering six-armed semaphore capable of transmitting over 900,000 distinct signals. This network facilitated rapid communication between the penal settlement at Port Arthur and Hobart. Signalmen, often accompanied by their families, endured varying weather conditions, working in shifts from 6am to 9pm.

In 1880, Tasmania's first telephone line replaced the semaphore, marking the advent of modern telecommunications. Despite technological advancements, the station continued to play a crucial role. In 1938 doubts about its future were dispelled.

There was a base station for ship-to-shore radio-telephone communication in 1958. Operations ceased in 1969, ending 158 years of communication history.

Since 1979, management of the Mount Nelson site has been under the purview of the Parks and Wildlife Service. Today, the station maintains ties to its heritage, flying the Tasmanian State flag daily and utilising International maritime signal flags to welcome ships and mark special occasions.

== Truganini Conservation Area ==
Named after Nuennonne woman Truganini, the Truganini Conservation Area protects native bushland on Mount Nelson's southeast flank. A 90-minute bushwalk (4.2-kilometre (2.6 mi)) from the Signal Station to Sandy Bay provides some views of diverse vegetation, a Truganini Memorial, as well as wildflowers and native birds, including the endangered swift parrot.

== Wildlife ==
Mount Nelson is a key breeding ground for the endangered swift parrot. The area hosts around 1,000 breeding pairs, with ongoing conservation efforts focused on protecting and sustaining their habitat.

== Sources ==
- Piech, MA (2009-01-01), Large suburban and bush Tasmanian blue gums (Eucalyptus globulus) and black gums (Eucalyptus ovata) in Mount Nelson, Tasmania, as foraging resources for the endangered swift parrot (Lathanzus discolor)
