= Echo (computing) =

Display of data which has been transmitted

In telecommunications, echo is the local display of data, either initially as it is locally sourced and sent, or finally as a copy of it is received back from a remote destination. Local echo is where the local sending equipment displays the outgoing sent data. Remote echo is where the display is a return copy of data as received remotely. Both are used together in a computed form of error detection to ensure that data received at the remote destination of a telecommunication are the same as data sent from the local source (a/k/a echoplex, echo check, or loop check). When (two) modems communicate in echoplex mode the remote modem echoes whatever it receives from the local modem.

== Terminological confusion: echo is not duplex ==
A displayed 'echo' is independent of 'duplex' (or any) telecommunications transmission protocol. Probably from technical ignorance, "half-duplex" and "full-duplex" are used as slang for 'local echo' (a/k/a echo on) and 'remote echo', respectively, as typically they accompany one another. Strictly incorrect, this causes confusion (see duplex). Typically 'local echo' accompanies half-duplex transmission, which effectively doubles channel bandwidth by not repeating (echoing) data back from its destination (remote), as is reserved-for with 'full duplex' (which has only half of the bandwidth of 'half duplex'). Half-duplex can be set to 'echo off' for no echo at all.

One example of 'local echo' used together with 'remote echo' (requires full-duplex) is for error checking pairs of data characters or chunks (echoplex) ensuring their duplicity (or else its just an extraneous annoyance).

Similarly, for another example, in the case of the TELNET communications protocol local echo operates on top of a full-duplex underlying protocol. The TCP connection over which the TELNET protocol is layered provides a full-duplex connection, with no echo, across which data may be sent in either direction simultaneously. Whereas the Network Virtual Terminal that the TELNET protocol itself incorporates is a half-duplex device with (by default) local echo.

== Where echoing is done ==
Terminals are one of the things that may perform echoing for a connection. Others include modems, some form of intervening communications processor, or the host system with which the terminal is communicating. For several common computer operating systems, it is the host system that performs the echoing, if appropriate (which it isn't for, say, entry of a user password when a terminal first connects and a user is prompted to log in). On OpenVMS, for example, echoing is performed as necessary by the host system. Similarly, on Unix-like systems, echo is performed by the operating system kernel's terminal device driver, according to the state of a device control flag, maintained in software and alterable by applications programs via an ioctl() system call. The actual terminals and modems connected to such systems should have their echo facilities switched off (so that they operate in no echo mode), lest passwords be locally echoed at password prompts, and all other input appear echoed twice. This is as true for terminal emulator programs, such as C-Kermit, running on a computer as it is for real terminals.

== Controlling echo ==
=== Terminal emulators ===
Most terminal emulator programs have the ability to perform echo locally (which sometimes they misname "half-duplex"):

- In the C-Kermit terminal emulator program, local echo is controlled by the SET TERMINAL ECHO command, which can be either SET TERMINAL ECHO LOCAL (which enables local echoing within the terminal emulator program itself) or SET TERMINAL ECHO REMOTE (where disables local echoing, leaving that up to another device in the communications channel—be that the modem or the remote host system—to perform as appropriate).
- In ProComm it is the Alt+E combination, which is a hot key that may be used at any time to toggle local echo on and off.
- In the Terminal program that came with Microsoft Windows 3.1, local echo is controlled by a checkbox in the "Terminal Preferences" dialogue box accessed from the menu of the terminal program's window.

=== Modems ===
The Hayes AT commands that control local echo (in command mode) are E0 for off and E1 for on. For local echo (in data mode), the commands are F1 and F0 respectively. Note the reversal of the suffixed digits. Unlike the "E" commands, the "F" commands are not part of the EIA/TIA-602 standard.

=== Host systems ===
Some host systems perform echo, in their device drivers and so forth.

- In Unix and POSIX-compatible systems, echo is a flag in the POSIX terminal interface, settable programmatically with the tcsetattr() function. (Note: In the older and superseded Seventh Edition Unix terminal interface, BSD version 4 terminal interface, and System III/System V terminal interface, it was settable via the ioctl() system call.) The echoing is performed by the operating system's terminal driver code (in some way that is not specified by the POSIX standard). The standard utility program that alters this flag programmatically is the stty command, using which the flag may be altered from shell scripts or an interactive shell. The command to turn echo by the host system on is stty echo and the command to turn it off is stty -echo. (Note: This may not seem to work if used interactively. It does work. It's just immediately overridden. Some shells, such as tcsh, reset the terminal modes, including turning echo off, when they are about to prompt for input. They actually place the terminal into non-canonical mode with echo off, and handle echoing themselves, restoring the prior terminal attributes when the input line has been read. Any shell or other program that uses GNU readline also exhibits this interaction with stty -echo.)
- On OpenVMS systems, the operating system's terminal driver normally performs echoing. The terminal characteristic that controls whether it does this is the ECHO characteristic, settable with the DCL command SET TERMINAL /ECHO and unsettable with SET TERMINAL /NOECHO. (Note: Note that this is not the same as the LOCAL_ECHO terminal characteristic, settable with the DCL command SET TERMINAL /LOCAL_ECHO and unsettable with SET TERMINAL /NOLOCAL_ECHO. That characteristic controls whether the terminal itself performs local echo.)
