= Truganini (disambiguation) =

Truganini may refer to:

- Truganini
- Truganini (song)
- Truganini (book)
- Truganini Conservation Area
- Truganini Parish, New South Wales
