= Dial peer =

A dial peer, also termed addressable call endpoint, initiates or obtains calls within a telephone network.

== See also ==
- VoIP
- Session Initiation Protocol
- Foreign exchange station
- Foreign exchange office
- Off-premises extension
- Private line automatic ringdown
