= Communication endpoint =

Type of communication network node

A communication endpoint is a type of communication network node. It is an interface exposed by a communicating party or by a communication channel. An example of the latter type of a communication endpoint is a publish–subscribe topic or a group in group communication systems.

== See also ==
- Connection-oriented communication
- Data terminal equipment
- Dial peer
- End system
- Host (network)
- Terminal (telecommunication)
