= Elizabeth College (Hobart) =

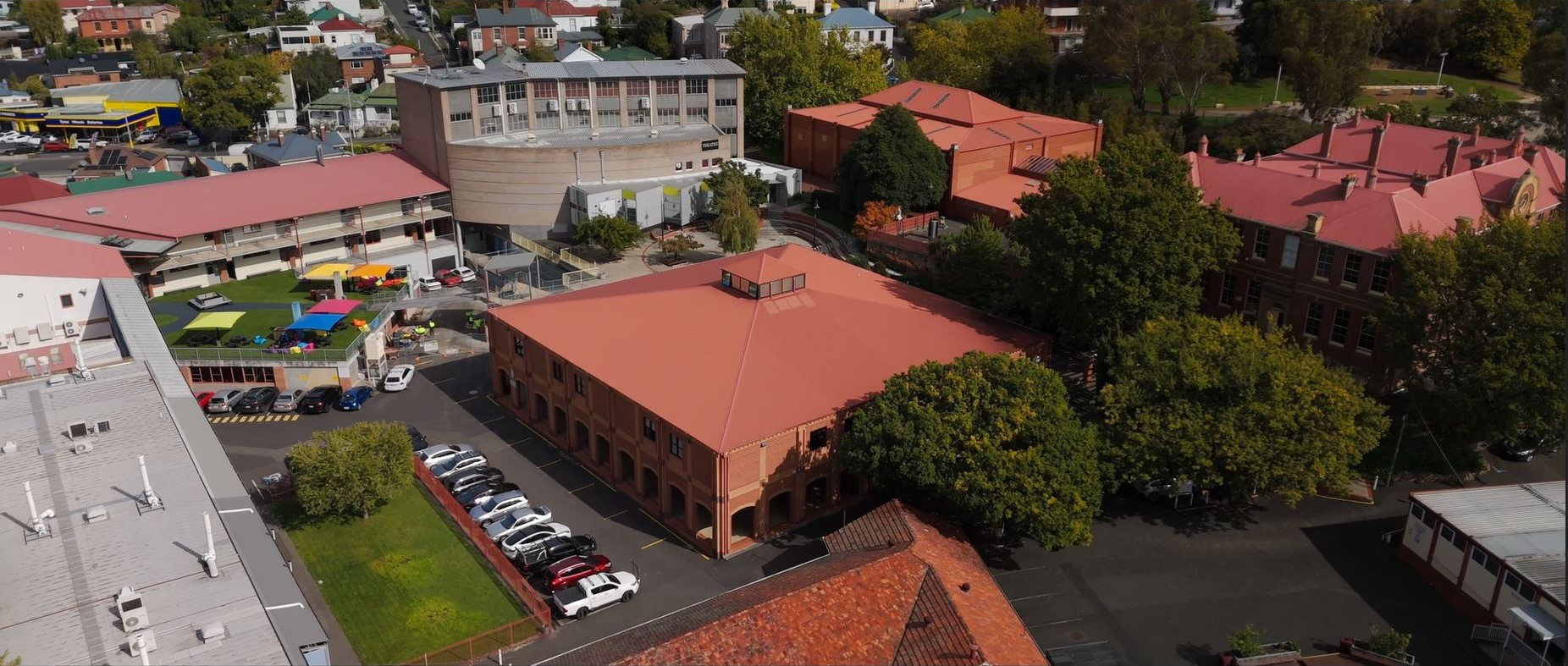
- Elizabeth College Campus

Location
- 256 Elizabeth Street; North Hobart, Tasmania; Australia; 42°52′41″S 147°19′05″E

Information
- Type: Government comprehensive senior college
- Motto: Unlock Your Potential
- Established: 1911; 115 years ago as Elizabeth Street School
- Status: Open
- School district: Southern
- Educational authority: Department for Education, Children and Young People
- Oversight: Office of Tasmanian Assessment, Standards & Certification
- Principal: Shane Fuller
- Staff: 90.7 FTE (2023)
- Teaching staff: 61.5 FTE (2023)
- Years: 11–12
- Enrolment: 748.8 FTE (2023)
- Campus type: Inner-city urban
- Website: elizabethcollege.tas.edu.au

Elizabeth College is a government comprehensive senior secondary school located in Hobart, Tasmania, Australia. Established in 1911 as the Elizabeth Street School and known as Elizabeth College since 1985, the college caters for approximately 800 students in Years 11 and 12 and is administered by the Department for Education, Children and Young People.

In 2023 student enrolments were 748.8 FTE. The college principal in 2022 is Shane Fuller.

== History ==
From 1842 onwards, a school was established when Holy Trinity Church constructed a small school of two classrooms on the site. This school, known as Trinity Hill School, became the Elizabeth Street School in 1911. This school became known as a practising school for newly graduated teachers from the University of Tasmania, where students were taught in primary education. In 1918, the school was used as a hospital during the Spanish Influenza epidemic.

After World War II, the school became known as the Elizabeth Street Secondary Modern School, and taught girls and boys in secondary education. In 1968, the Elizabeth Matriculation College (EMC) was established when the high school was re-built to accommodate senior students wishing to study for the newly created Higher School Certificate. From 1972-1974 EMC also housed the Elizabeth Computer Centre (ECC) which in 1975 became a service branch of the Education Department. In 1985, the school became known as Elizabeth College.

== Subjects ==
The subjects that are taught at Elizabeth College fall within the curriculum of the Office of Tasmanian Assessment, Standards & Certification (TASC). Courses available at the college include Visual Arts, Performing Arts, Science, Mathematics, Languages, Media Production, Humanities, and many more. Upon successful completion of studies at the college, students are awarded the Tasmanian Certificate of Education.

Students are able to enroll in whichever courses they desire. A full-time workload is expected of all students in Tasmania until the age of 18 or completion of Year 12. However, to earn a Tasmanian Certificate of Education, they must pass at least one course that involves Numeracy and one that involves Literacy, with many courses covering these requirements.

== Facilities ==
Facilities at the college include a large library/study area in the centre of the campus, a gymnasium and many computer laboratories. These are used extensively and are often required for coursework.

Extra facilities include a weights training room, theatre, photographic darkrooms, MDT and auto workshops, and Student Services block. This area offers counselling and security services to students and the college. Staff here include a college chaplain, a security officer and college police officer, as well as counsellors.

The college also has a large cafeteria where activities for Harmony Day and other charitable events are held throughout the year. Adjacent to the cafeteria is Tang Cafe, which used primarily by students of Food Technology. There is also a student common room in H Block.

== International co-operation ==
Elizabeth College has ties across the world, including China and Japan. Every year there is a school trip organised to both China and Japan.

Elizabeth College has a sister school in Hiroshima, Japan called Inokuchi Senior High and in China called Quanzhou Foreign Language School. There are cultural exchanges to both of these schools on an annual and biannual bases and the schools visit the college.

== Notable alumni ==
- Scott Bacon, a former politician who represented the electorates of Denison and then Clark in the Tasmanian House of Assembly as a member of the Labor Party
- David Walsh AO, library lover, professional gambler, art collector, entrepreneur and philanthropist. He established The Museum of New and Old Art (MONA) in Berriedale, Dark MOFO and other cultural activities, all of which have had an enormous positive effect on Tasmania's economy, and enriched the cultural life of all Tasmanians who wish to avail themselves of the opportunites.
- Professor Sandra Wills OAM, a senior academic who played a major role in educational computing in Tasmania and Australia in the 1970s and 1980s, and gained an international reputation in distance education and e-learning through her work at the University of Woolongong and Charles Sturt University. In 2025 she was awarded a Medal of the Order of Australia (OAM) for services to tertiary education.
- Allan Branch, an entrepreneur, writer and businessman. He gained an international reputation developing smart mobile robots and later transferred his skills to establish a reputation for global corporate turnarounds. In 2025, he published a memoir, The Vandemonian.
