= Peter Conrad (academic) =

Australian-born academic of English literature

Peter Conrad (born 1948) is an Australian-born academic specialising in English literature, who taught at Christ Church at the University of Oxford. He is a fellow of the Royal Society of Literature.

Conrad was born in Hobart, Tasmania, and attended Hobart High School. After graduating from the University of Tasmania in 1968, Conrad went to Oxford University, UK, on a Rhodes Scholarship, studying at New College. He became a fellow of All Souls College from 1970 to 1973 before taking up his current post at Christ Church. There he taught English from 1973, and has been a visiting professor at Princeton University and at Williams College, and a guest lecturer throughout the United States. By 2018 he had retired.

His criticism includes a major history of English literature, The Everyman History of English Literature, a cultural history of the twentieth century, two autobiographical works and a novel. He has written books of criticism on Orson Welles and Alfred Hitchcock and has been a prolific writer of features and reviews for many magazines and newspapers including The New York Times, The New Yorker, The Observer, the New Statesman, and The Monthly.

Reviewing J. R. R. Tolkien's The Silmarillion in the New Statesman, Conrad stated that "Tolkien can't actually write".

A review by Richard Poirier of Conrad's 1980 book Imagining America in the London Review of Books found it "so slipshod, with such fundamental and pointedly homophobic misunderstandings of Oscar Wilde, Rupert Brooke and W. H. Auden", that the reviewer wondered how it made it into print.

== Bibliography ==
- The Victorian Treasure-House. London: Collins. 1973. ISBN 0-00-211883-1.
- Romantic Opera and Literary Form, Berkeley & Los Angeles: University of California Press, 1978, ISBN 0-520-03258-6
- Shandyism: The Character of Romantic Irony, Oxford: Basil Blackwell, 1978, ISBN 0-064-91267-1
- Imagining America, New York: Oxford University Press, 1980, ISBN 0-195-02651-9
- Television: The Medium and its Manners, Boston: Routledge & Kegan Paul, 1982, ISBN 0-710-09041-2
- The Art of the City: Views and Versions of New York, New York: Oxford University Press, 1984, ISBN 0-195-03408-2
- The Everyman History of English Literature, London: J. M. Dent, 1985, ISBN 0-460-04560-1
- A Song of Love and Death: The Meaning of Opera, New York: Poseidon Press, 1987, ISBN 0-671-64353-3
- Behind the Mountain: Return to Tasmania, London: Chatto & Windus, 1988, ISBN 0-701-13253-1
- Where I Fell to Earth: A Life in Four Cities, New York: Poseidon Press, 1990, ISBN 0-671-68233-4
- Underworld, Simon & Schuster, 1992, ISBN 0-671-75884-5
- Modern Times, Modern Places: Life and Art in the Twentieth Century, Thames & Hudson, 1999, ISBN 978-0-500-28151-2
- "New New World". Granta. 70: 11–37. Summer 2000.
- The Hitchcock Murders, Faber and Faber, 2002, ISBN 0-571-21060-0
- At Home in Australia, Thames & Hudson, 2003, ISBN 0-500-51141-1
- Orson Welles: The Stories of His Life, Faber and Faber, 2004, ISBN 0-571-20993-9
- Creation: Artists, Gods & Origins, Thames & Hudson, 2007, ISBN 0-500-51356-2
- How the World Was Won: The Americanization of Everywhere. Thames & Hudson. 2014. ISBN 9780500252086.
- Verdi and/or Wagner: Two Men, Two Worlds, Two Centuries, Thames & Hudson, 2014, ISBN 0-500-29085-7
- Mythomania: Tales of Our Times, Thames & Hudson, 2016, ISBN 0500292582
- Shakespeare: The Theatre of Our World, Head of Zeus, 2018, ISBN 1788540174
- The Mysteries of Cinema: Movies and Imagination, Thames & Hudson, 2021, ISBN 0500022992
