= End system =

Computer connected to a network

Using two end systems at once

In networking jargon, a computer, phone, or internet of things device connected to a computer network is sometimes referred to as an end system or end station, because it sits at the edge of the network. The end user directly interacts with an end system that provides information or services.

End systems that are connected to the Internet are also referred to as internet hosts; this is because they host (run) internet applications such as a web browser or an email retrieval program. The Internet's end systems include some computers with which the end user does not directly interact. These include mail servers, web servers, or database servers. With the emergence of the internet of things, household items (such as toasters and refrigerators), as well as portable, handheld computers and digital cameras, are all being connected to the internet as end systems.

End systems are generally connected to each other using switching devices known as routers rather than using a single communication link. The path that transmitted information takes from the sending end system, through a series of communications links and routers, to the receiving end system is known as a route or path through the network. The sending and receiving route can be different, and can be reallocated during transmission due to changes in the network topology. Normally, the cheapest or fastest route is chosen. For the end user, the actual routing should be completely transparent.

== See also ==
- Communication endpoint
- Data terminal equipment
- Edge device
- End instrument
- Host (network)
- Node (networking)
- Terminal (telecommunication)
