= Nelson Road, Hobart =

Street in Hobart, Tasmania, Australia

Nelson Road Tasmania

General information
- Type: Road
- Length: 3.9 km (2.4 mi)

Major junctions
- South end: Mount Nelson
- North end: Sandy Bay

Location(s)
- Major suburbs: Mount Nelson

Nelson Road is a key local road located in the southern suburbs of Hobart, Tasmania, Australia. It connects the suburb of Mount Nelson to Sandy Bay, providing a scenic route along the slopes of Mount Nelson.

== Route ==
Nelson Road begins in the residential area of Mount Nelson, starting near the Southern Outlet. It heads north through bushland and residential areas, descending towards Sandy Bay. The road offers panoramic views of the Derwent River and the city of Hobart.

As it enters Sandy Bay, Nelson Road connects with Sandy Bay Road, a major thoroughfare that runs along the Hobart waterfront. The road is known for its sharp turns and elevation changes as it winds through the foothills of Mount Nelson.

== History ==
Nelson Road has long served as an important route for residents of Mount Nelson and the surrounding areas. The road has historical significance as one of the early access routes to the Mount Nelson Signal Station, which played a key role in Hobart's colonial communication systems.

After considerations by Queensborough Town Board found "this would be a splendid road for tourists and others, as the magnificent views of the river obtained on the eastern slope could not be surpassed anywhere", the Public Works Department eventually contracted the construction of the "long-talked-of tourist drive to the top of Mount Nelson" for £2,350 or £2,900 in 1908, connecting Sandy Bay Road to Mount Nelson Signal Station. The road provided access between the growing suburban areas of Sandy Bay and Mount Nelson. Over the years, upgrades have been made to improve the safety of the road, which includes the installation of guardrails and speed limit adjustments due to the road's steep and winding nature.

== Upgrades ==
Several improvements have been made to Nelson Road in recent years to accommodate increasing traffic volumes. These upgrades have primarily focused on enhancing road safety, particularly during adverse weather conditions, and reducing congestion during peak hours.

In addition, walking and cycling paths have been integrated into parts of the road, allowing for safer pedestrian access between Mount Nelson and Sandy Bay.

== Major intersections and towns ==
LGA	Location	km	mi	Destinations	Notes
Mount Nelson	0.0	0.0	Southern Outlet – Hobart, Kingston	Southern terminus of road	
Sandy Bay	3.9	2.4	Sandy Bay Road – Hobart, Battery Point	Northern terminus of road	
1.000 mi = 1.609 km; 1.000 km = 0.621 mi

== See also ==
- Roads in Tasmania
- Mount Nelson, Tasmania
- Sandy Bay, Tasmania
