= Host (network) =

Computer connected to a network

A network host is a computer or other device connected to a computer network. A host may work as a server offering information resources, services, and applications to users or other hosts on the network. Hosts are assigned at least one network address.

A computer participating in networks that use the Internet protocol suite may also be called an IP host. Specifically, computers participating in the Internet are called Internet hosts. Internet hosts and other IP hosts have one or more IP addresses assigned to their network interfaces. The addresses are configured either manually by an administrator, automatically at startup by means of the Dynamic Host Configuration Protocol (DHCP), or by stateless address autoconfiguration methods.

Network hosts that participate in applications that use the client–server model of computing are classified as server or client systems. Network hosts may also function as nodes in peer-to-peer applications, in which all nodes share and consume resources in an equipotent manner.

== Origins ==
In operating systems, the term terminal host denotes a time-sharing computer or multi-user software providing services to computer terminals, or a computer that provides services to smaller or less capable devices, such as a mainframe computer serving teletype terminals or video terminals. Other examples of this architecture include a telnet host connected to a telnet server and an xhost connected to an X Window client.

The term Internet host or just host is used in a number of Request for Comments (RFC) documents that define the Internet and its predecessor, the ARPANET. RFC 871 defines a host as a general-purpose computer system connected to a communications network for "... the purpose of achieving resource sharing amongst the participating operating systems..."

While the ARPANET was being developed, computers connected to the network were typically mainframe computer systems that could be accessed from dumb terminals connected via serial ports. Since these terminals did not host software or perform computations themselves, they were not considered hosts as they were not connected to any IP network, and were not assigned IP addresses. User computers connected to the ARPANET at a packet-switching node were considered hosts.

== Nodes, hosts, and servers ==
A network node is any device participating in a network. A host is a node that participates in user applications, either as a server, client, or both. A server is a type of host that offers resources to the other hosts. Typically, a server accepts connections from clients who request a service function.

Every network host is a node, but not every network node is a host. Network infrastructure hardware, such as modems, Ethernet hubs, and network switches are not directly or actively participating in application-level functions, do not necessarily have a network address, and are not considered to be network hosts.

== See also ==
- Communication endpoint – Type of communication network node
- End system – Computer connected to a network
- Hostname – Label that is assigned to a device connected to a computer network
- Port (computer networking) – Communications endpoint in an operating system
- Terminal (telecommunication) – Device which ends a telecommunications link
- Uniform Resource Identifier – String used to identify a name of a web or internet resource, which usually includes a host
