= Bruny Island Tasmanian language =

Extinct language of Tasmania

Bruny Island
- Nuenonne
- Region: Bruny Island, Tasmania
- Ethnicity: Bruny tribe of Tasmanians
- Extinct: perhaps 8 May 1876, with the death of Truganini
- Language family: Eastern Tasmanian: Bruny (Southeastern); Bruny Island
- Dialects: Milligan vocabulary

Language codes
- ISO 639-3: xpz
- Glottolog: brun1235
- AIATSIS: T5 (includes SE Tasmanian)

Bruny Island Tasmanian, or Nuenonne ("Nyunoni"), a name shared with Southeast Tasmanian, is an Aboriginal language or pair of languages of Tasmania in the reconstruction of Claire Bowern. It was spoken on Bruny Island, off the southeastern coast of Tasmania, by the Bruny tribe.

Bruny Island Tasmanian is attested in a list of 986 words collected by Joseph Milligan (published 1857 & 1859); in 515 words collected by George Augustus Robinson; in 273 words from Charles Sterling; and in 111 words from Robert Andrew Roberts (published 1828). Roberts' list was also published by Charles Medyett Goodridge in 1832; this version shows some differences from Roberts' list published in the Hobart Town Courier on 3 May 1828. The Milligan vocabulary is divergent, and falls out as a distinct language when the lists are compared at p < 0.15, though it falls together with the rest of the island at a looser criterion of p < 0.20.

== History ==
The last speaker of Bruny Island was likely Truganini, who is also widely accepted as the last full-blooded Tasmanian Aboriginal person. She was a daughter of Mangana, Chief of the Bruny Island people. Her name was the word her tribe used to describe the grey saltbush Atriplex cinerea. In her youth, she took part in her people's traditional culture, but Aboriginal life was disrupted by European invasion.

When Lieutenant-Governor George Arthur arrived in Van Diemen's Land in 1824, he implemented two policies to deal with the growing conflict between settlers and the Aboriginal peoples. First, bounties were awarded for the capture of Aboriginal adults and children, and secondly an effort was made to establish friendly relations with Aboriginal Peoples in order to lure them into camps. The campaign began on Bruny Island, where there had been fewer hostilities than in other parts of Tasmania.

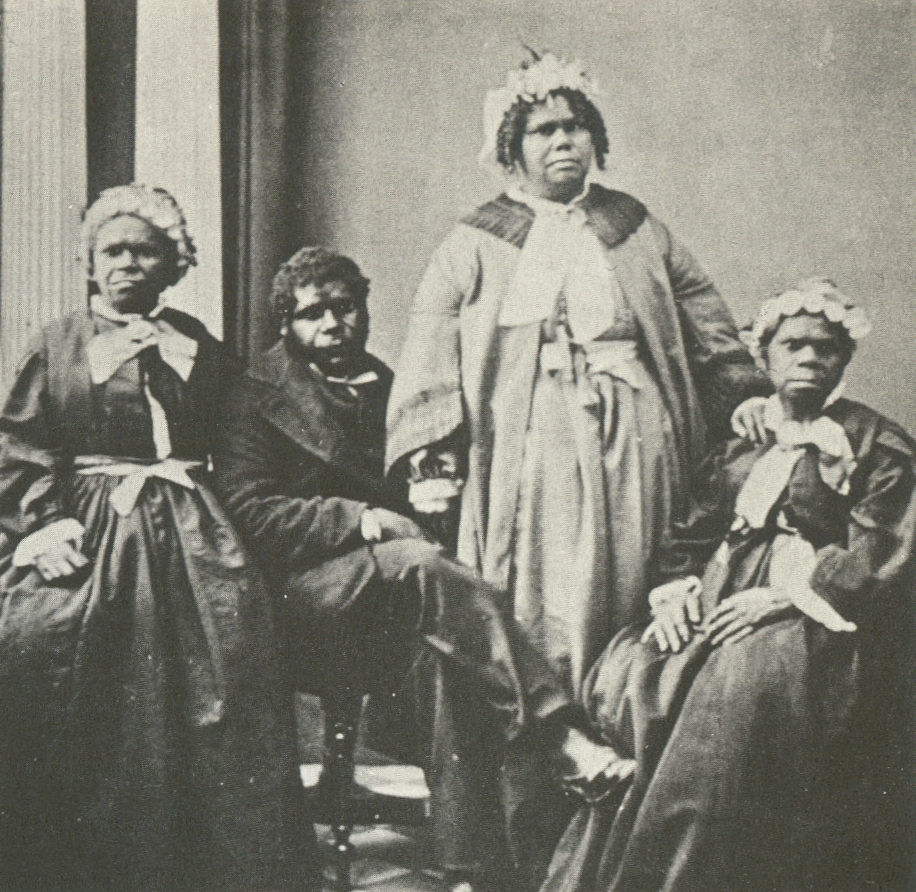
Truganini, seated right

When Truganini met George Augustus Robinson, the Protector of Aborigines, in 1829, her mother had been killed by sailors, her uncle shot by a soldier, her sister abducted by sealers, and her fiancé brutally murdered by timber-getters, who then repeatedly sexually abused her. In 1830, Robinson, moved Truganini and Woorrady to Flinders Island with the last surviving Tasmanian Aboriginal peoples, numbering approximately 100. The stated aim of isolation was to save them, but many of the group died from influenza and other diseases. Truganini also helped Robinson with a settlement for mainland Aboriginal People at Port Phillip in 1838.

After about two years of living in and around Melbourne, she joined Tunnerminnerwait and three other Tasmanian Aboriginal peoples as outlaws, robbing and shooting at settlers around Dandenong and starting a long pursuit by the authorities. They headed to Bass River and then Cape Paterson. There, members of their group murdered two whalers at Watsons hut. The group was captured and sent for trial for murder at Port Phillip. A gunshot wound to Truganini's head was treated by Dr. Hugh Anderson of Bass River. The two men of the group were found guilty and hanged on 20 January 1842. Truganini and most of the other Tasmanian Aboriginal peoples were returned to Flinders Island several months later.

In 1856, the few surviving Tasmanian Aboriginal people on Flinders Island, including Truganini, were moved to a settlement at Oyster Cove, south of Hobart.

== "Running text" ==
The following is a sermon which George Augustus Robinson preached to the aboriginals on Bruny Island after having stayed there for eight weeks. The first line is Robinson's transcription, followed by a reconstruction of what sounds Robinson was trying to represent, and finally an English gloss.

MOTTI NYRAE PARLERDI MOTTI NOVILLY RAEGEWROPPER PARLERDI NYRAE PARLERDI MAGGERER WARRANGELLY RAEGEWROPPER MAGGERER TOOGENNER UENEE NYRAE PARLERVAR LOGERNER TAGGERER TEENNY LAWWAY WARRANGELLY PARLERDI NYRAE {RAEGE (etc.)} NOVILLY PARLERVAR LOGERNER TAGGERER TEENNY TOOGUNNER RAEGEWROPPER UENEE MAGGERER UENEE
moti nairi palati moti nowili retji-ropa palati nairi palati makara waran-ngali retji-ropa makara tökana wini nairi palawa lookana takara tini lawey waran-ngali palati nairi retji nowili palawa lookana takara tini tökana retji-ropa wini makara wini
one good God one bad devil God good God stop sky devil stop below fire good native dead goes road up sky God good {white man} bad native dead go road below devil fire stop fire

This would roughly translate to:

"God is good, the devil is bad. God is good. God in heaven stops the devil in hell. A good Aboriginal or a good white person goes to heaven when he/she dies, while a bad Aboriginal or a bad white person goes to hell. God stops the devil in hell."

This is the only "running text" ever recorded for any of the Tasmanian languages. This sermon is mostly English replaced word-for-word with Bruny Island words stripped of their grammar, so is not a good indicator of what Bruny Island grammar was like.
