= Hobart College, Tasmania =

Hobart College

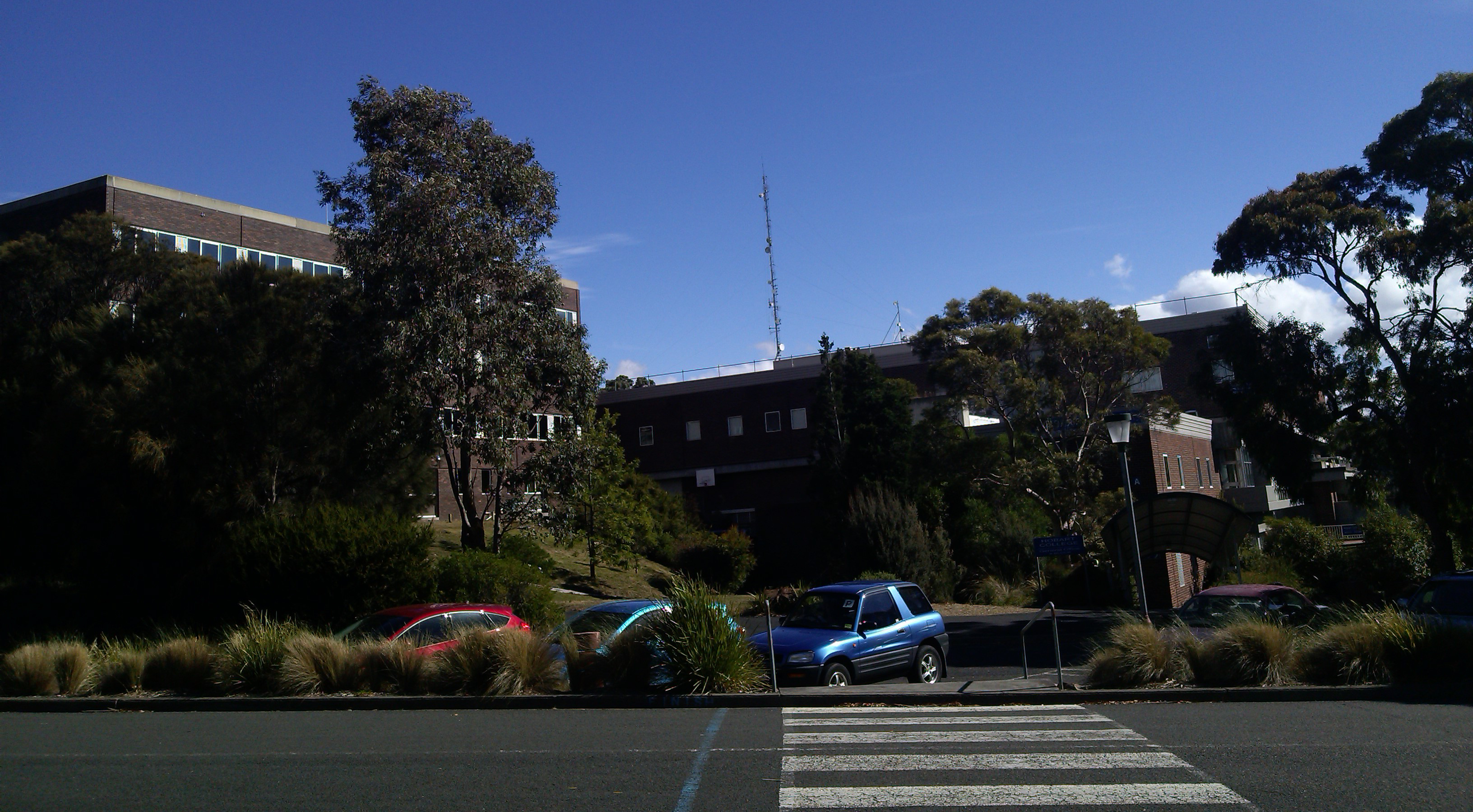
- Front of Hobart College campus, A & B block buildings

Location
- Olinda Grove; Mount Nelson, Hobart, Tasmania; Australia; 42°55′10″S 147°18′57″E

Information
- Type: Government comprehensive senior college
- Motto: Tradition, Diversity, Excellence
- Established: 1 January 1913; 113 years ago as Hobart High School
- Status: Open
- Sister school: Fuzhou Number 8 Middle School, China
- School district: Southern
- Educational authority: Department for Education, Children and Young People
- Oversight: Office of Tasmanian Assessment, Standards & Certification
- Principal: Dr Libby Robinson
- Staff: 118.5 FTE (2023)
- Teaching staff: 87.7 FTE (2023)
- Years: 11–12
- Enrolment: 1,285.1 FTE (2023)
- Campus type: Inner-city urban
- Colours: Blue and yellow
- Website: hobartcollege.education.tas.edu.au

Hobart College is a government comprehensive senior secondary school located in Mount Nelson, a suburb of Hobart, Tasmania, Australia. Established in 1913 as Hobart High School, it was later renamed as Hobart Matriculation College in 1965, and subsequently renamed as Hobart College. The college caters for approximately 1,300 students in Years 11 and 12 and is administered by the Department for Education, Children and Young People.

In 2023 student enrolments were 1285.1 FTE. The college principal is Dr Libby Robinson. As of 2018, the college had educated twenty students who progressed to being awarded a Rhodes Scholarship.

== History ==
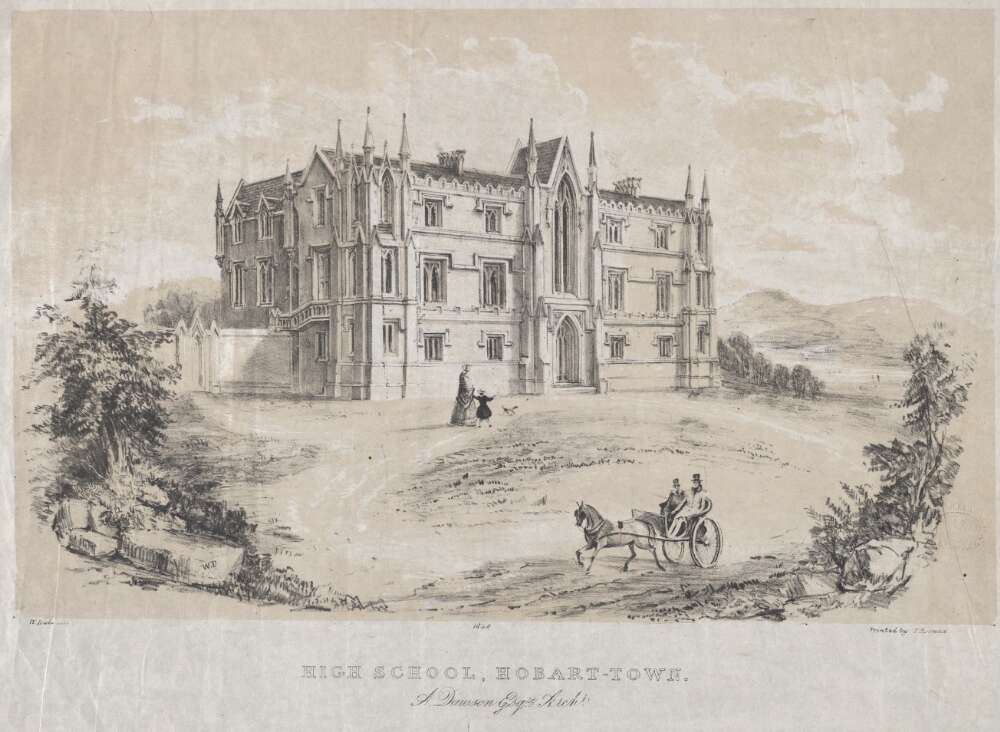
Hobart High School (1848), by William Duke.

An independent school, called Hobart High School operated from 1850 to 1884.

Hobart College was the first government school in Tasmania to be developed solely for years 11 and 12, the students in years 7–10 being re-directed to other government high schools such as Taroona High School.

The current Hobart College campus was originally part of the former Tasmanian College of Advanced Education, established in 1972, a large part of which was eventually absorbed into the University of Tasmania. Buildings on the campus reflect the architectural style of inner city American college designers of the late 1960s, with massive concrete facades and few windows in the earliest buildings. Hobart Matriculation College relocated to the Mount Nelson campus from its previous 71 Letitia Street, North Hobart location in 1984. Prior to this, between 1913 and 1917 the Hobart High School was located at Trinity Hill, also in North Hobart.

=== Trinity Hill ===
The commencement of the Hobart State High School was an important step for education in Tasmania, as it was the first state high school set up in Tasmania. A high school was also established in Launceston sharing two classrooms of the Charles Street Primary School.

In order to gain entrance to the new state high schools students had to have a qualifying certificate from a class teacher and pass their grade 6 exam. Attendance at high school was optional. On 26 November 1912, 885 students sat for the exams, and 513 qualified to enter high school either in Hobart or Launceston. However, only about half actually enrolled. Some of the students were permitted to start the second year when the school started.

The old Trinity Hill state school was remodelled to accommodate the high school. There were five classrooms, a teacher's room, a science room, two cloak rooms, and a woodwork workshop. Classes started on 28 January 1913 at 9 AM. The new high school was officially opened by the Premier, Albert Solomon on 29 January 1913. The school started with 137 scholars, 69 girls and 86 boys. The original courses included teaching, university preparation, industrial, commercial, and home making. Common subjects for each course were English, geography, history, mathematics, music and physical culture. Students in the teaching course also had to learn a foreign language, science, and woodwork or cookery. Students desiring to enter university had to study two foreign languages, and two science subjects. Commercial school students had to study business principles and practice, shorthand and bookkeeping. The industrial course was for those that wanted to be mechanics. It included drawing, benchwork and science. The domestic course included needlework, cooking and domestic hygiene. The foreign language courses included Latin for university entrance, and French and German were considered more useful for occupational benefit. History covered Australian history and English history. Science subjects included Chemistry and Physics. Mathematics included Geometry and Algebra.

An intermediate certificate would be issued after two years of education on passing the exams. A leaving certificate was issued to those that completed the two year upper school courses.

The purpose of the high school was to provide for education of students that would otherwise drop out after primary school. The aim was not to satisfy examiners, but to "broaden and deepen the educational outlook and cultivating right thoughts and actions".

The first principal was Mr P. H. Mitchell B.A. who was previously working as principal at the Beaconsfield Primary school. The other original teachers that started at the school were Mr. G. L. Wood, Mr C. L. Sharp, Miss Law, Mr. R. C. Stephens, BA., and Miss M. W. Weaver, B.A. In 1914 the Hobart State High School in its second year had 113 first year students, 74 second year, and 35 in third year. Fourth year class had not yet started. Enrollments for each course were secondary course: 49; teachers: 28; industrial: 33; commercial: 97. Space for the school was insufficient, and with overcrowding even the cloakrooms were used as classrooms. The teacher's residence at Ivy Lodge was then planned to convert to woodwork workshops for students. Later space was rented in the Hobart Baptist Tabernacle.

The school moved to the Letitia Street building, and its accommodation was immediately taken over by the infant department of the nearby Elizabeth Street Practising School.

In 2013 the building was sold by the Tasmanian Government for A$2.8 million.

=== Letitia Street campus ===
From 1918 to 1984 the school was located at 71 Letitia Street, North Hobart.

A new site for the Hobart State High School was selected in North Hobart on a 1-hectare (2-acre) block between Park Street (now the Brooker Highway), Federal Street and Letitia Street, on which a tramway ran. It was adjacent to the Queens Domain and close to the North Hobart recreation ground. One building was designed with space, ventilation, lighting and heating. The building cost £15,000.

The new site was officially opened by the premier G. H. Lee on 18 December 1917. The Hobart State High School started at the new location on 29 September 1918. By 1919 in addition to the main building there was a separate block containing science laboratories and wordworking and fitting shops. A new building for science and music opened on 7 June 1958.

Students were organised into three colour groups for sporting competition purposes, red green and blue. Later on gold was added.

A Student's Christian Union formed in 1920, let by YMCA staff, it met once a week.

By 1922 high school study had been extended to five years, with an additional year required to achieve the Intermediate Certificate. In the same year an inter-school sports included hockey, football, cross-country running, tennis, cricket and swimming. Four extra classrooms were added to the main building in 1928 at a cost of A£2,162 by H. W. Pease.

The 21st celebration of the Hobart High School was celebrated with a speech night at the Hobart City Hall attended by the Governor of Tasmania, Sir Ernest Clark on 6 March 1934. Later in the week there was a swimming carnival and sports competition. A special church service at the Wesley Church completed the week of celebration on Sunday.

In 1935 two blind pupils enrolled from the nearby Institution of the Blind, Deaf and Dumb and were provided Braille textbooks. One of these successfully completed 5 years. The school was again excessively crowded, with the locker room in the basement being used as a classroom. In this year wireless was installed throughout the school.

In 1936 the government considered building a new high school at nearby New Town.

The Governor-General of Australia, Lord Gowrie visited the school in February 1937. Film projectors were ordered in 1938. Also in 1938 intermediate exams were abolished, which meant that the intermediate certificate was based on schoolwork from 1939 onwards. A basketball court and two new tennis courts were made available in 1939. In 1940 extra building work included a library, dining room, gymnasium, domestic science block and fences.

During World War II, the Hobart State High School contained the first aid post for sector 7, North-East Hobart. A new canteen opened at the site on 12 March 1953.

== Mount Nelson campus facilities ==
College facilities include a drama auditorium, sport and recreation centre, library, various computer laboratories, canteen, and many sporting fields.

- A-Block is the largest of the college's buildings. It houses the school's main entry and offices, and the student common area and canteen. A-Block also houses the library, student services, and principals' offices. Courses taught primarily in A-Block include, but are not limited to, accounting, business, and economics, history, geography, and social and behavioural sciences, legal studies, tourism, information systems, and music and dance. The International Student Centre is also located in A-Block
- C-Block contains arts and technology teaching areas. This includes a kitchen, cafe, and wood and metal work rooms.
- D-Block contains performing arts, foreign languages, health, English, and the adjoining Mount Nelson Theatre.
- E-Block contains the science laboratories and mathematics teaching areas, and the student study areas.
- F-Block contains the sport and outdoor education teaching areas. This includes a gymnasium, fitness centre, and a climbing wall.
- G-Block contains the glass and ceramics studio.

Hobart College also has a car park for student and teacher use and a bus mall. A ring-road surrounds Hobart College that is used as the perimeter of the campus grounds. Outside of the ring-road is the Sustainability Learning Centre where the Student Environment Team (SET) gather and develop strategies for a more sustainable environment. The SET has audited the fortnightly collection of recycling wheelie bins by Veolia, partnered with the City of Hobart to introduce the Food Organics and Garden Organics collection scheme, removed single-use plastics from the college canteen, and developed a draft College Waste Management Policy.

== Alumni ==
Graduates from the Hobart State High School are called "Old Hobartians". This term was suggested by the teacher R. C. Stephens. The Old Hobartians Association was formed on 19 June 1915.

=== Notable alumni ===
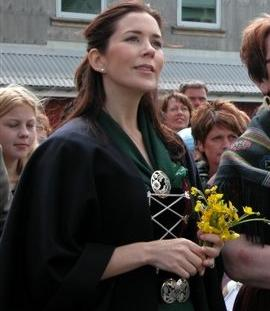
Former Old Hobartian, Queen Mary of Denmark

- Eric Abetz (born 1958), former Liberal Senator for Tasmania
- David Bartlett (born 1968), former Premier of Tasmania
- Sir Max Bingham QC (born 1927), Rhodes Scholar and former Deputy Premier of Tasmania
- Ashton Calvert AC (1945–2007), Rhodes Scholar and former senior Australian public servant
- Peter Conrad (born 1948), Rhodes Scholar and English academic
- Mary Donaldson (born 1972), Queen Mary of Denmark, R.E.
- Rodney Eade (born 1958), Australian rules football coach
- Stuart Hamilton AO (born 1950), Rhodes Scholar and former senior Australian public servant
- Malcolm McCusker AC, CVO, QC (born 1938), former Governor of Western Australia
- Nick McKim (born 1965), Australian Senator representing Tasmania, former leader of the Tasmanian Greens, State Minister and Member of the Tasmanian House of Assembly

=== Notable alumni of the independent Hobart High School ===
- Charles Button (1838–1920), lawyer, judge and politician in New Zealand

== Publications ==
Over the years the school has produced several publications.

- Magazine – 1914–1918
- The Centurion: a monthly magazine of pleasant and varied reading – 1918
- The Log
- The Compass: Hobart High School science journal – 1955–1967
- Knots – 1959
- Probe – 1964–1968
- Handbook – 1960s–2007

== See also ==
- Tasmania Tomorrow
- List of schools in Tasmania
- Education in Tasmania

== Additional reading ==
- Batt, Neil, ed. (1963). Fifty years, 1913-1963 : the history of the Hobart High School. Hobart: Hobart High School. pp. 1–96.
