= UNIX/32V =

Unix operating system port for DEC VAX architecture

- Developer: AT&T Bell Laboratories
- Written in: C
- OS family: Unix (Seventh Edition Unix)
- Working state: Discontinued
- Source model: Open source, previously closed source
- Initial release: June 1979; 46 years ago
- Available in: English
- Supported platforms: VAX
- Default user interface: Command-line interface (Bourne shell)
- License: BSD 4-Clause License
- Preceded by: Version 7 Unix
- Succeeded by: 3BSD, UNIX System III

UNIX/32V is an early version of the Unix operating system from Bell Laboratories, released in June 1979. 32V was a direct port of the Seventh Edition Unix to the DEC VAX architecture.

== Overview ==
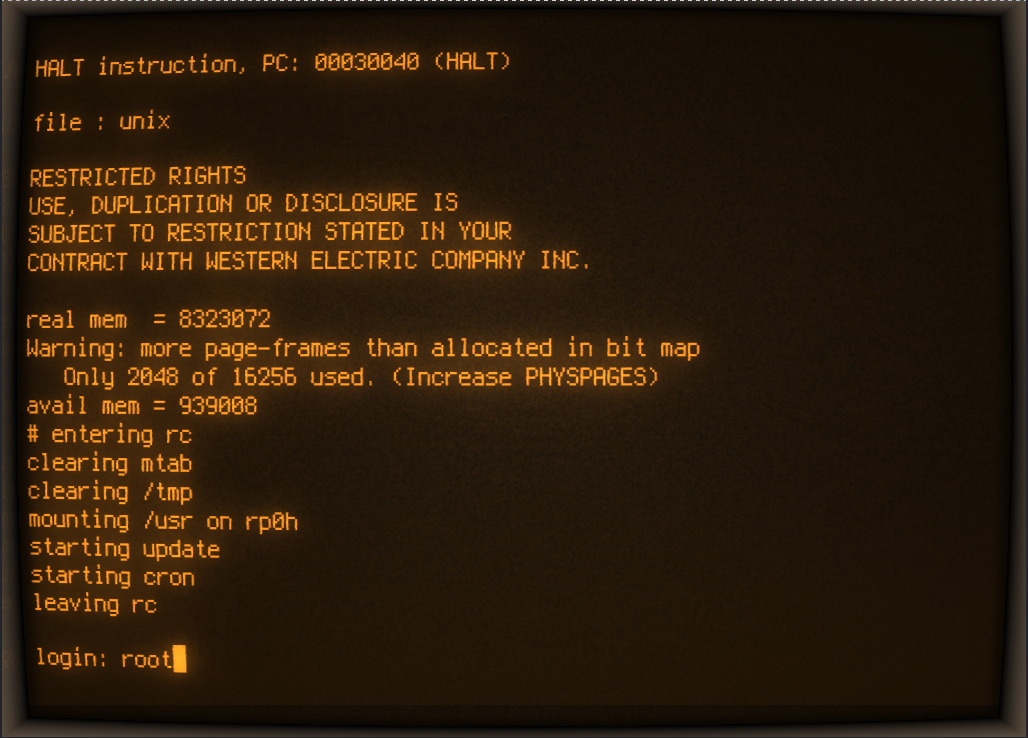
Version 7 Unix for the VAX 11/780, running in the SIMH VAX 11/780 simulator displayed on Cool Retro Term

Before 32V, Unix had primarily run on DEC PDP-11 computers. The Bell Labs group that developed the operating system was dissatisfied with DEC, so its members refused DEC's offer to buy a VAX when the machine was announced in 1977. They had already begun a Unix port to the Interdata 8/32 instead. DEC then approached a different Bell Labs group in Holmdel, New Jersey, which accepted the offer and started work on what was to become 32V.

Performed by Tom London and John F. Reiser, porting Unix was made possible due to work done between the Sixth and Seventh Editions of the operating system to decouple it from its "native" PDP-11 environment. The 32V team first ported the C compiler (Johnson's pcc), adapting an assembler and loader written for the Interdata 8/32 version of Unix to the VAX. They then ported the April 15, 1978 version of Unix, finding in the process that "[t]he (Bourne) shell [...] required by far the largest conversion effort of any supposedly portable program, for the simple reason that it is not portable."

UNIX/32V was released without virtual memory paging, retaining only the swapping architecture of Seventh Edition. A virtual memory system was added at Berkeley by Bill Joy and Özalp Babaoğlu in order to support Franz Lisp; this was released to other Unix licensees as the Third Berkeley Software Distribution (3BSD) in 1979. Thanks to the popularity of the two systems' successors, 4BSD and UNIX System V, UNIX/32V is an antecedent of nearly all modern Unix systems.

== See also ==
- Ancient UNIX
