= Nuenonne language =

Extinct Aboriginal language of Tasmania

Nuenonne
- (Mainland) Southeast Tasmanian
- Region: south-eastern mainland Tasmania
- Ethnicity: Bruny tribe of Tasmanians
- Extinct: 19th century
- Revival
- Language family: Eastern Tasmanian: Bruny; Nuenonne

Language codes
- ISO 639-3: xpf
- Glottolog: sout1439
- AIATSIS: T5 (includes Bruny Island)

Nuenonne ("Nyunoni"), or Southeast Tasmanian, is an extinct Aboriginal language of Tasmania. It was spoken along the southeastern mainland of the island by the Bruny tribe.

Mainland Southeast Tasmanian is attested by 202 words collected by François Péron (1802) and by 573 words in various vocabularies collected by the D’Entrecasteaux expedition of 1792–1793 and published by Labillardière in 1800 and by Rossel in 1808. The French transcriptions of these sources differ from the English respellings seen in the records of other varieties of Tasmanian.

== Bibliography ==
- Labillardiere, J. J. Houtou de. Relation du voyage a la recherche de La Pérouse, vol. 2, pp. 44-46. (Paris, 1800).
- Labillardiere, J. J. Houtou de. Voyage in search of La Perouse, vol. 2, appendix pp. 19-20. (London, 1800). (Octavo ed.: vol. 2, pp. 43-47).
- Labillardiere, J. J. Houtou de. An account of a voyage in search of La Perouse, vol. 2, pp. 393-396. (London, 1802; 2nd ed.)
- Péron, F. and Freycinet, L. de. Voyage de découvertes aux terres australes, vol. 2, pp. 126-129. (Paris, 1824; 2nd ed.)
- Rossel, E. P. E. de. Vocabulaire de la langue d’une des peuplades de la terre de Van-Diémen. Voyage de D'Entrecasteaux, envoyé a la recerche de La Pérouse, vol. 1, pp. 552-556. (Paris, 1808).
- Rossel, E. P. E. de. Manuscript vocabularies in journals of officers of the ships, Archives de la Marine, Archives Nationales, Paris.
