= Mount Nelson, Tasmania =

Mount Nelson
- Suburb
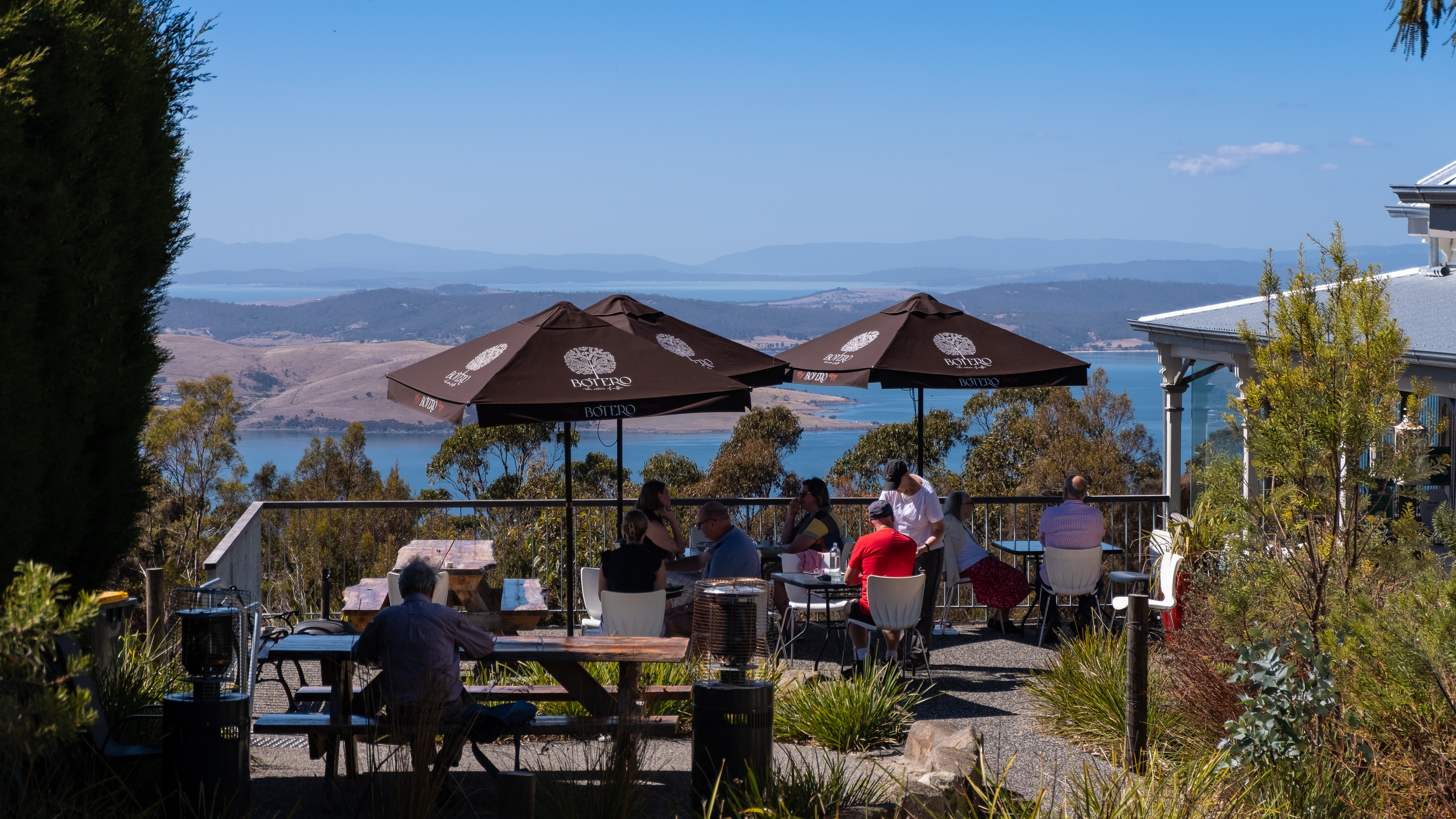
- Mount Nelson Signal Station Cafe

- Interactive map of Mount Nelson
- Coordinates: 42°55′15″S 147°19′23″E
- Country: Australia
- State: Tasmania
- City: Hobart
- LGA: City of Hobart, Kingborough Council

Government
  - State electorate: Clark
  - Federal division: Clark

Population
  - Total: 2,749 (2021 census)
- Postcode: 7007
Suburbs around Mount Nelson
Tolmans Hill	Sandy Bay	Sandy Bay
Ridgeway	Mount Nelson	Sandy Bay
The Lea	Albion Heights	Taroona

Mount Nelson is a residential suburb of Hobart, Tasmania, located 4 km (2.5 mi) south of the Hobart central business district. It is part of both the City of Hobart and Kingborough Council municipalities. The suburb was developed post-World War II and includes educational institutions such as Hobart College and Mount Nelson Primary School. The area features native bushland, recreational amenities, and access to the Truganini Conservation Area. As of the 2021 census, Mount Nelson had a population of 2,749. The suburb is accessible by road from Sandy Bay and is serviced by several Metro Tasmania bus routes.

The suburb covers approximately 5.9 square kilometres (2.3 sq mi), including 14 parklands that account for 16.3% of its area. Its first thoroughfare, Nelson Road, was constructed in 1908 to improve access to the historic Mount Nelson Signal Station, which served as a semaphore link between Hobart and Port Arthur during the colonial era.

Mount Nelson is popular with tourists for attractions such as the Mount Nelson Signal Station, the Truganini Conservation Area, and several walking trails. It also features educational facilities, including Hobart College and the Sustainability Learning Centre, as well as recreational amenities like the University Soccer Club and Mount Nelson Oval.

== History ==
Significant suburban development in Mount Nelson began after 1945, driven by government initiatives to accommodate immigrants seeking refuge following the devastation of World War II in Europe. This period marked the transformation of Mount Nelson into a growing residential suburb. A former firing range located north of the bends on Nelson Road was later repurposed as farmland for the University of Tasmania.

A post office, originally named Rialannah, opened on 1 April 1948 and was renamed Mount Nelson in 1956. It remained in operation until its closure in 1971.

In 1967, Mount Nelson was severely affected by the Black Tuesday bushfires, which destroyed a large number of homes and caused widespread devastation across southern Tasmania.

=== Name origins ===
Mount Nelson, the mountain in which the suburb is situated, was named in 1811 by Governor Lachlan Macquarie, in honour of the brig HMS Lady Nelson, which played a significant role in the early European exploration and settlement of Van Diemen’s Land. The Lady Nelson was part of the fleet that brought the first British settlers to Hobart in 1803, and Macquarie himself travelled aboard the vessel during his 1811 visit to the colony.

Despite common misconceptions, the mountain was not named after British admiral Lord Nelson, famed for his victory at the Battle of Trafalgar.

Another myth attributes the naming to Captain William Bligh during his 1788 voyage aboard HMS Bounty, suggesting it was in honour of his botanist, David Nelson. This claim has appeared in local histories and tourism materials. The presence of Bligh Court and Christian Street off Nelson Road, which may reference figures from the Bounty voyage, appears to have contributed to the persistence of this misconception.

== Demographics ==
With an estimated resident population of 2,766 as of 2022, Mount Nelson contains a population density of 421.7 persons per square kilometre. In 2021, the predominant age group in Mount Nelson is 40 years with 2.5 residents per household.

Of the population, 49.7% were male and 50.3% were female. Aboriginal and/or Torres Strait Islander people made up 2.0% of the population.

In terms of cultural background, 70.0% of people were born in Australia, while the most common overseas countries of birth were China (5.1%), England (4.0%), and New Zealand (1.2%). English was the only language spoken at home for 77.4% of households, with Mandarin (6.4%) and Cantonese (1.1%) being the next most common languages.

Regarding housing, there were 1,176 private dwellings in Mount Nelson. Family households comprised 68.7% of all households, single-person households 27.0%, and group households 4.4%. The average household size was 2.5 people.

The median weekly household income was $1,687, slightly below the national median of $1,746. Median monthly mortgage repayments were $1,586, and the median weekly rent was $320.

== Facilities and recreation ==
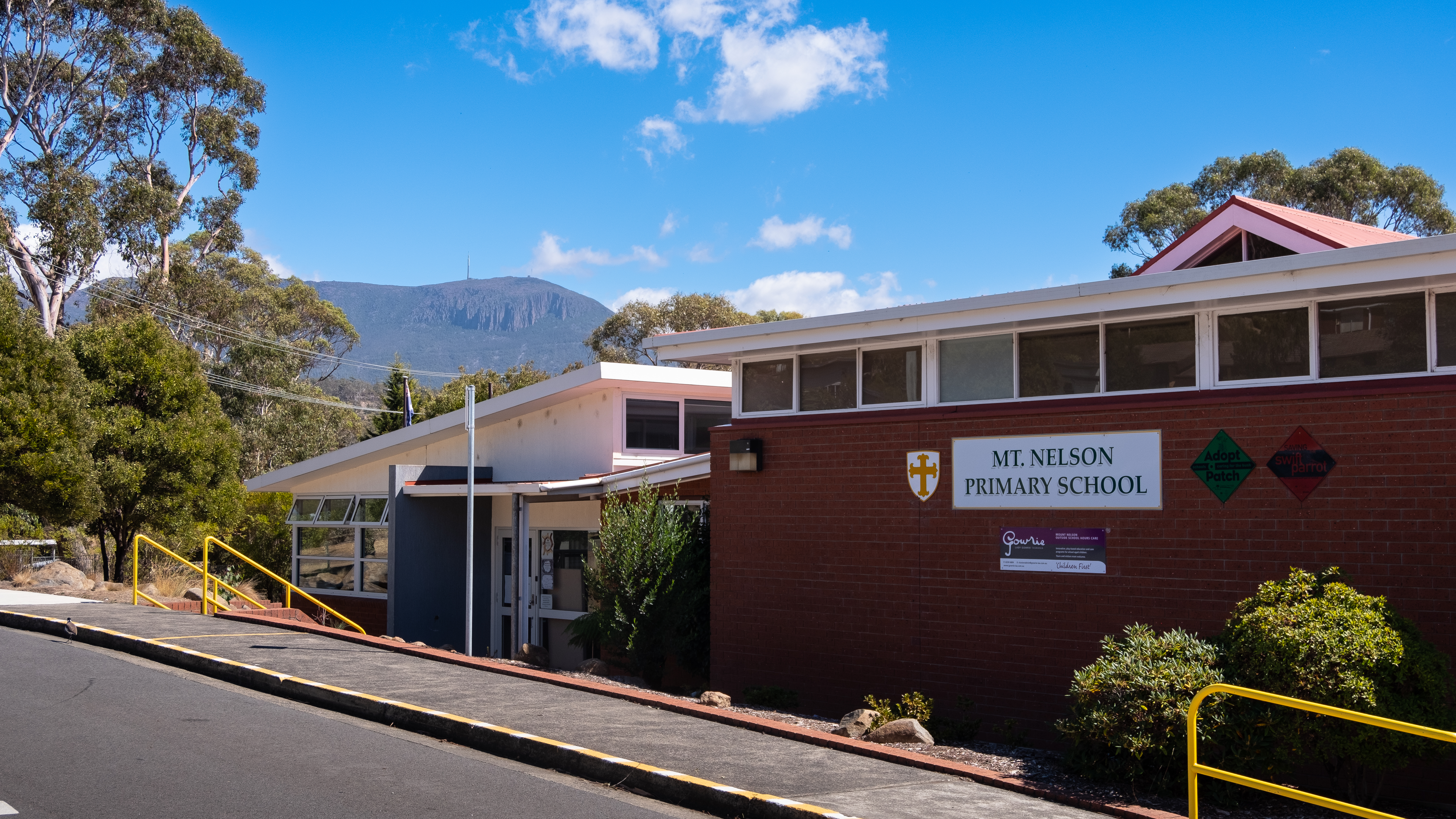
Mount Nelson Primary School

Mount Nelson is served by the Mount Nelson Medical Centre, a general store, dental clinic and pharmacy. The Mount Nelson Fire Station is situated at 40 Olinda Grove.

=== Educational facilities ===
Mount Nelson boasts several educational institutions, including Hobart College, one of the city's four public secondary colleges. Notably, Queen Mary of Denmark, wife of Frederik X, is an alumna of Hobart College. Mount Nelson is home to Mount Nelson Primary School, catering to approximately 200 students from kindergarten to Grade 6. The school serves as a feeder to Taroona High School and encompasses students from Mount Nelson and Tolmans Hill.

== Access ==
Mount Nelson is accessible via Proctors Road off the Southern Outlet and Nelson Road commencing in Sandy Bay. The suburb is serviced by Metro Tasmania bus routes 457, 458, X58 and school routes direct to Hobart College 412, 413, 415 and 417.

== Sources ==
- Piech, MA (1 January 2009), Large suburban and bush Tasmanian blue gums (Eucalyptus globulus) and black gums (Eucalyptus ovata) in Mount Nelson, Tasmania, as foraging resources for the endangered swift parrot (Lathanzus discolor)
