= Mount Lewis Signal Station =

Semaphore station in Tasmania, 1813–1870

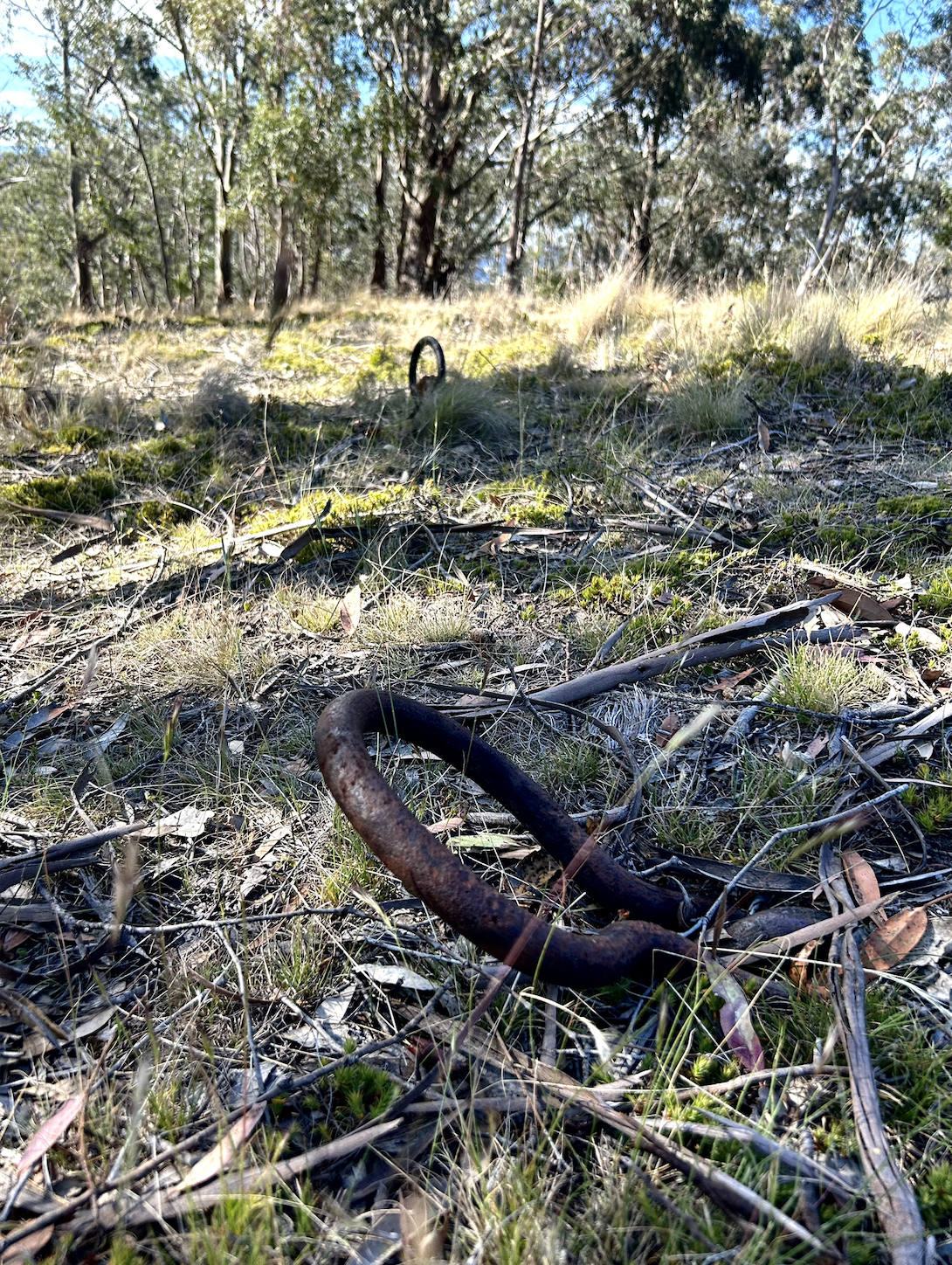
Iron anchor rings for the semaphore ropes at Mount Lewis Signal Station

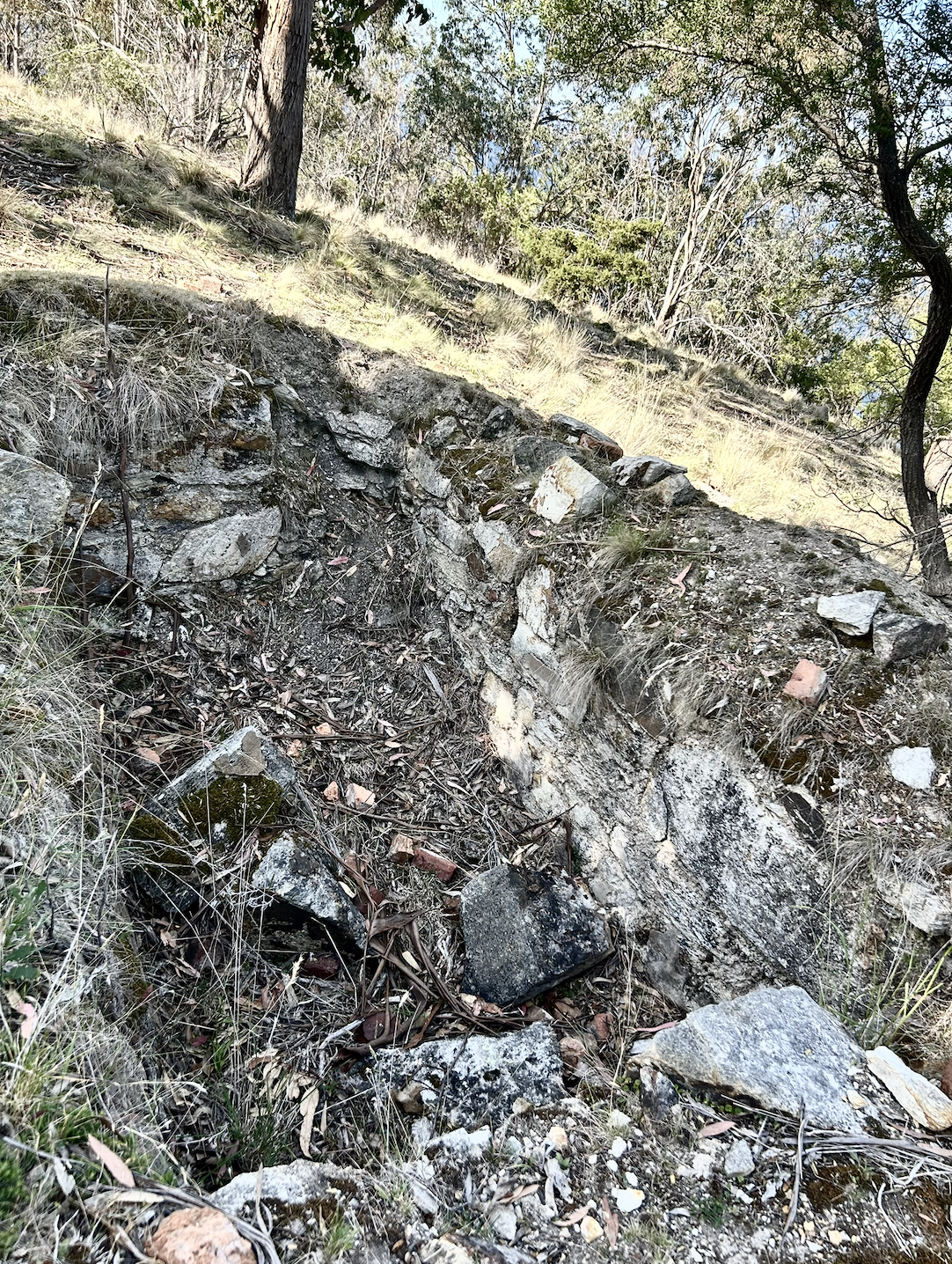
Remains of the water tank used to supply the Mount Lewis Signal Station, c.1813

Mount Lewis (Mount Louis) Signal Station was a Semaphore signal station on the summit of Mount Lewis, near Tinderbox overlooking the D'Entrecasteaux Channel in Tasmania. It stood on a twenty acre site 726 feet above sea level.

== The Signal ==
The semaphore was a crude system of rotating arms, one above the other and was operated by ropes.[1] Semaphore messages were sent by raising and lowering the arms to set positions.

In 1885, the signal was described by The Mercury as "a clearing on the rounded hill top and a mournfully looking flagstaff surmounting it."
