= Terminal concentrator =

Hardware device for multiplexing serial terminal connections

Terminal concentrators, also known as terminal multiplexers, were hardware devices used to multiplex multiple serial terminals to a single hardware computer connection. Examples of terminal multiplexers were the IBM 3299 and the terminal multiplexers made by Gandalf Technologies.

== See also ==
- Concentrator
- Modem sharing device
