= Terminal (telecommunication) =

Device which ends a telecommunications link

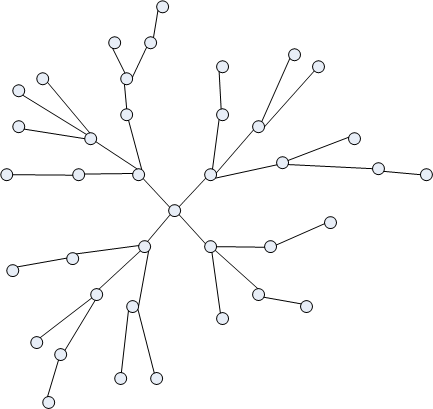
Network terminal nodes are at the edges of the network

In the context of telecommunications, a terminal is a device which ends a telecommunications link and is the point at which a signal enters or leaves a network. Examples of terminal equipment include telephones, fax machines, computer terminals, printers and workstations.

An end instrument is a piece of equipment connected to the wires at the end of a telecommunications link. In telephony, this is usually a telephone connected to a local loop. End instruments that relate to data terminal equipment include printers, computers, barcode readers, automated teller machines (ATMs) and the console ports of routers.

== See also ==
- Communication endpoint
- Data terminal equipment
- End system
- Host (network)
- Node (networking)
- Terminal equipment
