= Bash (Unix shell) =

GNU replacement for the Bourne shell

- Original author: Brian Fox
- Developer: Chet Ramey
- Release: 8 June 1989; 37 years ago
- Stable release: 5.3 / 3 July 2025; 16 months ago
- Written in: C
- Operating system: Linux; Unix-like; macOS; Windows; Android; Oracle Solaris
- Platform: GNU
- Available in: Multilingual (gettext)
- Type: Shell (computing), Unix shell, command language
- License: v.4.0+: GPL-3.0-or-later; v.1.11 – v.3.2: GPL-2.0-or-later; v.0.99 – v.1.05: GPL-1.0-or-later
- Website: www.gnu.org/software/bash/
- Repository: git.savannah.gnu.org/cgit/bash.git

Bash (short for "Bourne Again SHell") is an interactive command interpreter and command language developed for Unix-like operating systems. Supported by the Free Software Foundation and created in 1989 by Brian Fox for the GNU Project, it is designed as a completely free software alternative for the Bourne shell, sh, and other proprietary Unix shells. Having gained widespread adoption, Bash is commonly used as the default login shell for numerous Linux distributions. It also supports the execution of commands from files, known as shell scripts, facilitating automation.

The Bash command syntax is a superset of the Bourne shell's syntax, from which all basic features of the Bash syntax were copied. As a result, Bash can execute the vast majority of Bourne shell scripts without modification. Some other ideas were borrowed from the C shell, its successor tcsh, and the Korn Shell. It is available on nearly all modern operating systems, making it a versatile tool in various computing environments.

== Definitions ==
=== ASCII, strings and numbers ===
The input language to the shell shall be first recognized at the character level. (Note: "Ch. 2.10.1 Shell Grammar Lexical Conventions")

— IEEE & The Open Group

$ printf '<newline>:  <%b>\n' $'\n'
<newline>:  <
>
$ printf '<tab>:      <%b>\n' $'\t'
<tab>:      <	>
$ printf '<space>:    <%s>\n' " "
<space>:    < >
$ printf '<NUL>:      <%b>\n' $'\0'
<NUL>:      <>

Any series of characters is called a "string", or sometimes a "string literal". In Unix-like operating systems, all characters, printable and non-printing, except for a few such as the null character and forward slash /, can be used in filenames. In addition, all strings are case-sensitive. (Note: "UNIX is case sensitive. Because UNIX is case sensitive, our shell scripts are also case sensitive.")

Bash, like many other programming languages, uses zero-based numbering.

=== Control+key combinations ===
The Control+key functionality is provided by GNU Readline and is available in interactive mode only. Certain keypress combinations allow a user to operate Bash to use tab completion and to search the command history.

- Tab ↹ – Activate tab completion
- ↑ – Scroll up (i.e. backward) in the command history
- ↓ – Scroll down (i.e. forward) in the command history
- Ctrl+r – Search the command history

Some keypress combinations also allow a user to operate the terminal emulator in order to move the cursor within the terminal window and to control the emulator program. By default, these keypress combinations in Bash mirror those of Emacs. (Note: "Ch. 8 Command Line Editing")

Default keybindings for control codes include:

- Ctrl+f – Move the cursor one character to the right
- Ctrl+b – Move the cursor one character to the left
- Alt+f – Move the cursor one word to the right
- Alt+b – Move the cursor one word to the left
- Ctrl+a – Move the cursor to the beginning of the current commandline
- Ctrl+c – Cancels the current command and presents a new prompt
- Ctrl+d – Closes the current Bash instance, possibly also closing the terminal-emulator
- Ctrl+e – Move the cursor to the end of the current commandline
- Ctrl+q – Wake the terminal; buffered keypresses are then processed
- Ctrl+s – Put the terminal to sleep
- Ctrl+w – Remove one word to the left of the cursor
- Ctrl+z – Stop a foregrounded process

Vi keybindings are also available and can be enabled by running set -o vi. (Note: "Ch. 8.5 Readline vi mode")

=== Syntax ===
When Bash reads a full command line, the complete string is broken down into tokens. "Tokens" are identified using, and separated from each other using metacharacters.

As of Bash 5.3, the 10 metacharacters are the space, tab, and newline, as well as the following characters: |&;()<>

"Blanks" are composed entirely of unquoted metacharacters, "operators" each contain at least one unquoted metacharacter and "words" may not include any unquoted metacharacters.

In practice, Bash breaks down full command strings into tokens or groups of tokens that do contain metacharacters and tokens or groups of tokens that do not contain any metacharacters—called "words". From there it further breaks words down into more specific, meaningful pieces like command names, variable assignment statements, etc.

The two blanks are space and tab.

==== Operators ====
Control operators perform a control function. They can be either a newline or one of the following: ||, &&, &, ;, ;;, ;&, ;;&, |, |&, (, or ).

Redirection operators redirect the input or output streams. They include <, >, &>, <<, and <<<.

==== Words ====
A word is a sequence of (non-meta-) characters treated as a single unit by the shell. A reserved word is a kind of a word that has a special meaning to the shell. (Note: "Appendix D.2 Index of Shell Reserved Words")

A name is a kind of a word separate from reserved words. Names (A) consist solely of letters, underscores and numbers, (B) begin with either a letter or an underscore, and (C) may not begin with a number. Also called identifiers, names may be used for naming variables and functions.

Sixteen of the twenty-two "reserved words", which may be characters or words are as follows:

'!' '[[' '{' ']]' '}' case in esac for do done if then elif else fi ...

Names may only contain the characters ABCDEFGHIJKLMNOPQRSTUVWXYZabcdefghijklmnopqrstuvwxyz0123456789_.

In the following example of a full command string, metacharacters have a comma placed above them, ,, reserved words have a caret placed beneath them, ^, and other tokens have a backtick placed also beneath them, `.

$ #,  ,    ,   ,,    ,       ,,  ,
$   if echo foo; then bar=abc; fi
$ # ^^ ```` ```  ^^^^ ```````  ^^

=== Subshells ===
A "subshell" is an additional instance of the shell which has been initialized by a current instance of the shell. When a "parent" shell creates a subshell, or a "child" shell, an exact copy of the parent's environment information is re-created and becomes the environment of the subshell.

In Bash, in non-arithmetic contexts, one can force the use of a subshell by enclosing a full command string in single parentheses.

$ echo foo; ( echo foo )
foo
foo

For this simple case, the preceding two commands are equivalent, however, use of subshells can have certain unexpected side effects. There are numerous different forms of syntax which can cause the initialization of a subshell. A non-comprehensive list of operators that cause the initialization of a subshell is as follows:

- Subshells syntax, (), for example, would initialize a subshell:
  $ ( program arga argb )
- Piping syntax, A | B, would initialize multiple subshells, one for each separate command in the pipeline:
  $ program1 abc def | program2 -abc

=== Data structures ===
Bash offers variables and arrays as data structures, and though there are numerous kinds of each of these available, the data structures are relatively simple compared to other languages like C or Java. All data is stored in memory as a string.

Beginning a word with a dollar character signifies that the word is the name of a variable or array. Surrounding the dollar / variable name syntax in double quotes is always advised. This practice prevents a single value containing whitespace characters from being treated as multiple values.

Wrapping the variable name in curly brackets (braces) {} is recommended for readability and consistency between variables and arrays. When writing variables, curly brackets are optional and square brackets would be a syntax error. The parameter names are always on the left side of the equals sign and values are always on the right.

==== Variables ====
A variable is assigned to using the syntax name=value.

To use a variable, the syntax $name is used, or ${name}, which expands to the value assigned to the variable.

The latter syntax must be used for certain names to prevent unwanted side effects. For example, $10 will be parsed as ${1}0, so using ${10} means it will be parsed as intended.

Positional parameters, usually passed to a bash script, are denoted by the variables numbered starting from $1. Special parameters are signified by punctuation characters. For example, "$@" expands to a list of the first through last positional parameters, individually requoted, separated by spaces. (Note: "When the expansion occurs within double quotes, and word splitting is performed, each parameter expands to a separate word. That is, "$@" is equivalent to "$1" "$2" …." "Ch. 3.4.2 Special Parameters")

Environment variables are signified by all capital letters. Environment variables include UNIX variables like LESS_SIGUSR1, and Bourne shell variables such as HOME. Scripting variables are signified by all lower case letters or CamelCase. This is only convention; any variable can be passed to the export command to be made into an environment variable.

==== Arrays ====
Arrays are data structures which hold multiple values. (Note: "Ch. 6.7 Arrays")

Arrays have a set of square brackets placed at the end of the variable name and inside the curly braces. When writing arrays, curly braces and square brackets are required.

An array is assigned using the syntax name=( value1 value2 ... ). The syntax ${quux[0]} expands the element at index 0 while ${quux[@]} expands all elements. The syntax ${quux[*]} concatenates all the elements into a string where they're normally separated a by a single space unless the value of IFS has been modified.

Each kind of parameter is distinguished by a specific naming convention. (Note: "Ch. 2 Definitions")

Since Bash 4.0, Bash also supports associative arrays.

In this article, examples of variables from this section include ${foo}, PID, PWD, EUID, $$, ${quux} and ${zork} .

=== Execution ===
"Execution" of a given program occurs when a user (or some other program) asks the operating system to act upon the instructions contained in the given program.

By default, Bash reads user code one line at a time, interprets any newline or semi-colon character ; as the end of the current command, and executes commands in sequence. If an interactive command extends beyond the width of the terminal emulator, it is usually possible to keep typing and the command will wrap around. To extend a command beyond a newline onto an additional line, it is necessary that the final character of the first line be an unescaped backslash, \, which signals "line continuation". Bash always finishes parsing and executing one full commandline before moving on to and beginning with the parsing of the next commandline.

$ foo=aa bar=bb quux=cc zork=dd; set -o xtrace
$ : "${foo}"; : "${bar}"
+ : aa
+ : bb
$ : "${quux}" \
> : "${zork}"
+ : cc : dd

The first word of a command line is known as the "command position". Under UNIX coventionality, the first word of the command line is always some kind of command, and the rest of the words in the command line string are either options for the command, arguments for the options, or some kind of input upon which the command will operate. "Options" are also called "flags", "switches", or, more formally, "operators". When Bash attempts to locate a command for execution, the directories it searches are those listed in the $PATH variable and the current working directory.

$ # [COMMAND POSITION] [OPTION] [ARGUMENTS] 
$ # ,--^   ,------------^   ,----^
$ declare -p USER BASH_VERSION
declare -x USER="liveuser"
declare -- BASH_VERSION="5.2.37(1)-release"

=== Users and PS1 ===
A user account can be created for either a human or a programmatic user. In Unix-like operating systems, there are two kinds of users: "privileged" and "regular". A privileged user, such as root or the operating system kernel, is allowed to do anything whatsoever on the machine. Unprivileged users are limited in various ways.

When an interactive shell session waits for user input, by default it prints a particular string of characters to the screen. In Bash, the value of this waiting-string is held in the shell variable $PS1. For regular users, a common default value for $PS1 is the dollar character ($). (Note: Not to be confused with the shell variable "$$".) For the superuser, a common default value is hash (#)

$ sudo --login --user root
[sudo] password for liveuser:
# umask 077
# echo bob > /home/liveuser/names.txt
# exit
$ grep -e bob ./names.txt
grep: ./names.txt: Permission denied

== Modes ==
=== Programming paradigm ===
Although most users think of the shell as an interactive command interpreter, it is really a programming language in which each statement runs a command. Because it must satisfy both the interactive and programming aspects of command execution, it is a strange language, shaped as much by history as by design.

Bash is written in C. A modular style can be approximated through good style and careful design. It is often used in an imperative or procedural style.

=== Interactive and non-interactive modes ===
As a command processor, Bash can operate in two modes: interactive or non-interactive. In interactive mode, commands are usually read from a terminal emulator. In non-interactive mode, which facilitates automation, commands are usually read from named files known today as shell scripts. When executed as a standalone command at the command-line interface (CLI), by default Bash opens a new shell in interactive mode.

=== Scripts ===
Shell scripts are text files that contain code, often commands, intended to be read and acted upon by some particular interpreter in a batch process in a non-interactive mode and without any further user interaction. Interpreted scripts are programs that do not require their source code to be compiled: all of the relevant source code is contained within the script. There are many programs which can serve as a script interpreter: Perl, AWK, etc. Interpreted scripts are most often written for Unix shells.

The first two characters of the first line of any (executable) shell script begins with a something called a shebang: literally the characters hash (#) and bang (!) side by side.

$ cat ./example.sh
#! /bin/env bash
echo foo

If a script is intended to be run by a user as a stand-alone program on the commandline, then it is referred to as an "executable". By convention, the filenames of executable unix shell scripts are identified the suffix .sh. The "execute" bit can be enabled on a shell script with the utility chmod:

$ ls -l ./example.sh
-rw-r--r--.1 liveuser liveuser 32 Aug  3 22:33 example.sh
$ ./example.sh
bash: ./example.sh: Permission denied
$ chmod 0744 ./example.sh
$ ls -l ./example.sh
-rwxr--r--.1 liveuser liveuser 32 Aug  3 22:33 example.sh
$ ./example.sh
foo

=== The source builtin ===
With the source, or synonymous . command, Bash reads and executes shell commands from any text file by name. (Note: "Ch. 4.1 Bourne Shell Builtins")

=== Login and non-login shells ===
Bash can be executed as a login shell, or "session leader," in both interactive and non-interactive modes via the --login option. "Logging in" requires user authentication. For this reason, only one login shell exists per user session. In GNU/Linux, a user's login shell is identified in the /etc/passwd file.

$ awk -F ':' '$1 ~ /root/' /etc/passwd
root:x:0:0:Super User:/root:/bin/bash

When a human user initiates a login session, this procedure often occurs in a graphical user interface (GUI). When a user opens a terminal emulator, the emulator executes a non-login instance of the user's login shell.

Logging out of a shell session from within a terminal emulator can be accomplished with the exit command or, by default in Bash, pressing Ctrl+d.

=== Startup source files ===
When Bash starts, it uses source to execute commands in a variety of dotfiles (see lists below). These dotfiles, unlike shell scripts, typically have neither the execute permission enabled nor a hash-bang. By default Bash will source a somewhat different set of files, and in a different sequence, depending on: (Note: "Ch. 6.2 Bash Startup Files")

- How Bash is called: interactively, non-interactively, invoked with name sh
- Which options are used: --login, --rcfile, --norc, --posix
- Which environment variables are defined: BASH_ENV, ENV, and
- Which files exist:
  - /etc/profile
  - ~/.bash_profile
  - ~/.bash_login
  - ~/.profile
  - ~/.bash_logout, and
  - ~/.bashrc among others.

Of course, any startup file can also execute commands from any other file. Startup files can affect shell behavior, terminal emulators, the X window system and the window manager.

=== POSIX mode ===
The POSIX IEEE 1003.1 standard specifies a common set of definitions that any shell system application (bash, dash, zsh, etc.) may conform to. Any shell user script (./myscript.sh) written in conformance with POSIX guidelines should be executable by any shell system application that has implemented the POSIX specification. As a result, there can be a reasonable expectation that POSIX-compliant scripts can be executed with success on any Unix or Unix-like operating systems which implements the POSIX standard (Linux, OpenBSD, Oracle Linux, HP-UX, etc.). These scripts are considered "portable" as they are and without any further modifications. The portion of POSIX that applies to shells and command line utilities is a subset of a larger group of POSIX standards that further specify how terminals and terminal emulators aught to function in order to also be considered portable.

When Bash is operating in POSIX mode, fewer features are available but the resulting code can be executed on a greater variety of operating systems.

To enable POSIX mode at the initialization of an interactive shell, Bash can be executed as either sh, bash --posix or bash -o posix. (Note: "Ch. 36.9. Portability Issues")

To cause a script to be initialized in POSIX mode, one would use the either the hashbang #!/usr/bin/env sh or the less portable #!/bin/sh. When an instance of Bash is operating in POSIX mode, the environment variable $POSIXLY_CORRECT is defined, and the value of the environment variable SHELLOPTS includes the string posix.

$ declare -p POSIXLY_CORRECT SHLVL
bash: declare: POSIXLY_CORRECT: not found
declare -x SHLVL="1"
$ bash -o posix
$ declare -p POSIXLY_CORRECT SHLVL
declare -- POSIXLY_CORRECT="y"
declare -x SHLVL="2"

The full list of features available in Bash which are not specified by POSIX is considerable. Here is a partial list:

- Any arrays other than the array of positional parameters, $@, are not POSIX
- The double bracket extended test construct, [[...]], is not POSIX
  - [...] and test are POSIX
- One of the double-parentheses arithmetic-evaluation syntaxes, ((...)), is not POSIX
  - $((...)) is POSIX
- Brace expansion, kernel{,-headers}, is not POSIX
- Dynamic scoping of parameters and the local builtin are not POSIX
- Process substitution, <(...), is not POSIX
- Certain string-manipulation operations in parameter expansions are not POSIX
- Most Bash builtin commands are not POSIX
  - The command enable -s prints the list of Bourne special builtins, which are POSIX
    $ enable -s | wc --lines
16
$ enable | wc --lines
61
  - The enable builtin itself is not POSIX
  - In Bash, in non-POSIX mode, the . and source builtins are synonymous
    - The . (i.e., 'dot') builtin is POSIX, however
    - The source builtin is not POSIX
- The $EPOCHSECONDS and $EPOCHREALTIME shell variables are not POSIX

System commands which are available in modern Unix-like operating systems, and which are also specified by POSIX, may have fewer option flags or fewer relevant environment variables available under POSIX. Most (such as ls) are standalone programs in the /bin, /usr/bin, /sbin or /usr/sbin directories (in Linux, typically provided by GNU coreutils or BusyBox) rather than Bash builtins.

Because of these and other differences, modern (version 5) Bash shell scripts are rarely runnable "as-is" under the Bourne or legacy Korn shell interpreters. Scripting with portability in mind is becoming less common as GNU/Linux becomes more widespread.

Code that is valid syntax in Bash but not specified by POSIX is called a "bashism". The program checkbashisms can be used to make sure that a script can be executed in Debian Linux without any portability errors. Vidar Holen's shellcheck is another static linter written in Haskell which can parse script syntax for compatibility with any or all of bash, dash, ksh, and Bourne sh.

The syntax requirements for each shell are each a little different. For example, Debian's policy allows some extensions in their scripts (as they are in the dash shell), while a script intending to support pre-POSIX Bourne shells, like autoconf's configure, are even more limited in the features they can use.

=== Other modes ===
==== Restricted mode ====
A restricted shell is used to set up an environment more controlled than the standard shell. A restricted shell behaves identically to bash with the exception that numerous actions are disallowed or not performed, including:

- Changing directories with the cd builtin.
- Setting or unsetting the values of the SHELL, PATH, HISTFILE, ENV, or BASH_ENV variables.
- Specifying command names containing slashes on the CLI.
- Using absolute pathnames as arguments to the ., history, or hash -p commands.
- Specifying a path search with . -p or command -p.
- Importing function definitions and parsing the value of SHELLOPTS from the shell environment at startup.
- Redirecting output using the >, >, <>, >&, &>, and >> redirection operators.
- Using the exec builtin to replace the shell with another command.
- Altering shell builtins.

Once restricted mode is enabled, it cannot be disabled. These restrictions are enforced after any startup files are read, and it does not apply to shell scripts. Restricted mode is rarely used.

==== Privileged mode ====
In Bash, "privileged mode" is a rarely used option inherited from the SVR4.2 UNIX System V shell (circa 1992). (Note: "Appendix B.1 Implementation Differences From The SVR4.2 Shell") It can be enabled with set -p and disabled with set +p. (Note: "In this mode, the $BASH_ENV and $ENV files are not processed, shell functions are not inherited from the environment, and the SHELLOPTS, BASHOPTS, CDPATH and GLOBIGNORE variables, if they appear in the environment, are ignored." (Note: "Ch. 4.3.1 The Set Builtin"))

When privileged mode is enabled, the SHELLOPTS shell variables includes the string "privileged".

==== Extended debugging mode ====
Enabled via bash --debugger at invocation or via shopt -s extdebug during either interactive or non-interactive modes. It uses a separate program called bashdb. extdebug is not available in POSIX mode. See documentation for more information. See also § Debugging.

==== Compatibility modes ====
Bash-4.0 introduced the concept of a shell compatibility level, specified as a set of options to the shopt builtin (compat31, compat32, compat40, compat41, and so on). There is only one current compatibility level – each option is mutually exclusive. The compatibility level is intended to allow users to select behavior from previous versions that is incompatible with newer versions while they migrate scripts to use current features and behavior. It's intended to be a temporary solution. (Note: "Ch. 6.12 Shell Compatibility Mode")

— The GNU Bash Reference Manual

== Observability ==
=== The xtrace option ===
When xtrace is enabled, simple debugging content is printed to the terminal. It can be enabled with set -o xtrace or set -x, and disabled with set +o xtrace, set +x or set -. These options are also accepted at the commandline and at hash-bangs: #!/bin/bash -x, etc.

$ bash -x
$ echo $((  2 + 2  ))
+ echo 4
4
$ set -- 1 2 3
+ set -- 1 2 3
$ printf '<%s>\n' "$@"
+ printf '<%s>\n' 1 2 3
<1>
<2>
<3>

The xtrace shell setting is specified by POSIX. See also § Debugging.

=== The verbose option ===
The verbose option prints strings to the terminal as they are read, and before any expansions are performed. Rarely used. (Note: See set -v.)

=== Comments ===
Comments can be a valuable way of clarifying information or explaining a script or source file to someone else who might not be familiar with the scripter's intentions or context.

Standard comments in Bash are denoted with a hash character: #. Any text to the right of the hash to the end of the line will be ignored. Inline comments are allowed, but hash comments will not print during debugging. See also: § xtrace.

Comments denoted with a colon character, :, originated with the Thompson shell. Any arguments to the right of colon : builtin are ignored. Inline comments are not possible, but colon comments will print during debugging and any parameters will have been expanded. (Note: "Ch. 2.15 Special Builtins")

$ # Define foo
$ foo=bar # An inline hash comment occurs on the same line as a command
$ set -x
$ # A regular comment (no output)
$ : "${foo}"
+ : bar

=== Exit codes ===
When bash executes commands, exit status codes, also called "return codes," are produced which can offer some insight into the manner in which a program ceased running. The value of the most recently captured exit code is held within the shell parameter, 'question mark:' $?. In non-arithmetic contexts, (i.e., most of the time) the numerical or "Boolean" value of "true" is zero (0), and the value of "false" is one (1).

When a system command has executed, the intended meaning of its exit status can most often be found in its man page; usually a zero indicates success and a nonzero exit status indicates some kind of failure condition or partial success. ping is a well known command with three meaningful exit codes: 0, 1, and 2.

In Bash, within arithmetic contexts, the numerical truth values are reversed: "true" is one and "false" is zero. An arithmetic context can usually be identified by the syntax ((...)) or $((...)). If an arithmetic statement evaluates to the integer zero, then the statement is considered "true," and the exit code is one. If the statement evaluates to any number other than zero the arithmetic statement is "false" and the exit code is zero.

Not all Linux/UNIX commands provide meaningful exit codes beyond zero and one, and there is no standard system for definitions of exit codes in Linux.

$ true; echo $? # Exit code means "true"
0
$ false; echo $?; echo # Exit code means "false"
1
$
$ bash -c 'exit 99'; printf 'exit-code: %d\n' $?
exit-code: 99
$ ((  1 - 1  )); printf '%d\n' $? # This exit code means "true"
1
$ ((  1 + 1  )); printf '%d\n' $? # ...and this exit code means "false"
0

=== Job control ===
The Bash shell has two modes of execution for commands: batch (asynchronous), and concurrent (synchronous). To execute commands in batch mode (i.e., in sequence) they must be separated by the character ;, or on separate lines:

$ command1; command2
$ command3

In this example, when command1 is finished, command2 is executed, and when command2 has completed, command3 will execute. A background execution of command1 can occur using symbol & at the end of an execution command, and process will be executed in background while immediately returning control to the shell and allowing continued execution of commands.

$ command1 &

Or to have a concurrent execution of command1 and command2, they must be executed in the Bash shell in the following way:

$ command1 & command2

In this case command1 is executed in the background, & symbol, returning immediate control to the shell that executes command2 in the foreground. A process can be stopped and control returned to bash by typing Ctrl+z while the process is running in the foreground. (Note: "Ch. 7.1 Job Control Basics") A list of all processes, both in the background and stopped, can be achieved by running jobs:

$ jobs
[1]-  Running                  command1 &

In the output, the number in brackets refers to the job id. The plus sign signifies the default process for bg and fg. The text "Running" and "Stopped" refer to the process state. The last string is the command that started the process.

The state of a process can be changed using various commands. The fg command brings a process to the foreground, while bg sets a stopped process running in the background. bg and fg can take a job id as their first argument, to specify the process to act on. Without one, they use the default process, identified by a plus sign in the output of jobs. The kill command can be used to end a process prematurely, by sending it a signal. The job id must be specified after a percent sign:

$ sleep 100 &
[1] 4904
$ kill %1
$ jobs
[1]+  Terminated                    sleep 100

Job control, also known as "Monitor mode," is enabled by default in interactive shells, and can be disabled with set +m.

=== Signals ===
Signaling is a means of inter-process communication (IPC). Sometimes a commandline process may seem to freeze in the middle of execution. In these instances it may become necessary to identify which process may be blocked and to manually end the offending process.

At an interactive terminal, it is usually sufficient to press Ctrl+c to end the current foreground process and return control back to the user prompt, or to press Ctrl+z to suspend it. Occasionally attempting to suspend a process will succeed when attempts to cancel a process appear unresponsive. In other cases it may be necessary to use the kill program to send an IPC signal. In this example, we use the kill command from a second terminal screen to terminate the process with PID 4331.

$ tty # Terminal one
/dev/pts/0
$ whoami
liveuser
$ sleep 1000 # Command hangs

$ tty # Terminal two
/dev/pts/1
$ whoami
liveuser
$ ps aux | grep -e sleep -e PID
USER         PID %CPU %MEM    VSZ   RSS TTY      STAT START    TIME COMMAND       
liveuser    4331  0.0  0.0 230336  2312 pts/1    S+   11:19    0:00 sleep 1000
liveuser    4333  0.0  0.0 231248  2516 pts/0    S+   11:19    0:00 grep --color=auto -e sleep -e PID
$ kill 4331
$ ps aux | grep -e sleep -e PID # The sleep process has ended
USER         PID %CPU %MEM    VSZ   RSS TTY      STAT START    TIME COMMAND       
liveuser    4333  0.0  0.0 231248  2516 pts/0    S+   11:19    0:00 grep --color=auto -e sleep -e PID

$ tty # Terminal one again
/dev/pts/0
$ whoami
liveuser
$ sleep 1000
Terminated

In Unix-like operating systems, a user is allowed to instruct the kernel to send a signal to a process that is owned by the user. A regular user may not send a signal to a privileged process. Signals can be sent to a process using the kill builtin or using the system binary of the same name.

$ whoami
liveuser
$ ps aux | awk '$2 == "1"' # Let\s view some info on the kernel process, process 1.
root           1  0.0  0.2  37140 20440 ?        Ss   04:44    0:18 /usr/lib/systemd/systemd --switched-root --system --deserialize=53 rhgb
$ kill -s SIGKILL 1
bash: kill: (1) - Operation not permitted
$ type -a kill
kill is a shell builtin
kill is /usr/bin/kill
$ /usr/bin/kill -s SIGKILL 1
kill: sending signal to 1 failed: Operation not permitted

The most commonly used signals can be viewed with kill -L | head -n 4. Each IPC signal is associated with a signal number, but exit codes and signal codes are two different things. While sending a process an IPC signal of 9 (a "KILL" signal) will almost certainly terminate the process immediately, it will most likely not result in the process returning an exit code of 9.

By default in Bash, builtin kill sends a TERM ("terminate") signal. It's common for commandline utilities to respond to a SIGTERM by shutting down and exiting cleanly. (TERM and SIGTERM are the same, the SIG- prefix to all signal names can be omitted.) The Ctrl+c sequence in Bash sends a SIGINT, interrupt signal, to the foreground process. The Ctrl+z sequence sends the SIGSTOP, stop signal. (Note: "Stop, usually Ctrl + z.") When a process receives a SIGKILL, the process terminates immediately and messily. It is recommended to use SIGKILL only as a last resort. The SIGKILL signal cannot be blocked or handled.

Processes can "catch" and "handle" IPC signals they receive. A user can use the kill builtin to "send" an IPC signal to another process. That target process can set up a mechanism, some plan beforehand, for how to respond whenever any particular signal might be received, or "caught." The way a target program responds is referred to as how the program "handles" receiving the signal. In the man pages one can see how some system commands will print out certain information to the terminal when they receive a SIGHUP: for example, the dd command.

When bash is interactive, in the absence of any traps, it ignores SIGTERM (so that kill 0 does not kill an interactive shell), and catches and handles SIGINT (so that the wait builtin is interruptible). When bash receives SIGINT, it breaks out of any executing loops. In all cases, bash ignores SIGQUIT. If job control is in effect, bash ignores SIGTTIN, SIGTTOU, and SIGTSTP.

— bash(1)

By default Bash shell scripts receive and respond to any and all IPC signals sent to them, however, Bash scripts can utilize the trap builtin to catch and handle signals.

$ cat ./trap-example.sh 
#! /usr/bin/env bash
trap umask EXIT
echo bar
exit 0
$ chmod 0700 trap-example.sh
$ ./trap-example.sh 
bar
0077

There are a few signals which are only available from within Bash as GNU extensions: ERR, EXIT, RETURN and DEBUG. These signals can be useful in debugging, and can only be sent and handled by shell builtins. See also § Debugging.

=== Values of parameters ===
There are many different implementations of echo. Some have the -e option, and some don't. (Note: "In Korn shell the echo command recognizes these command options by default. In Bash shell we must add the -e switch to the echo command, echo -e "\n" for one new line.") The list of options is not uniform across implementations, though echo and printf are both specified by POSIX. If a scripter wishes to know the precise value of a string contained by a variable, then the most consistent way of doing so is to use printf.

For any string containing any character including digits, the format specifier is %s.

$ foo=abc bar=123
$ printf '<%s>\n' "${foo}" "${bar}"
<abc>
<123>

For digits only, the format specifier is %d.

$ printf '<%d>\n' "${foo}" "${bar}"
bash: printf: abc: invalid number
<0>
<123>

In the example below, where a newline has been omitted from the format string, the value of PS1 is printed on the same line as the output of the previous command.

$ printf '<%s>' "${foo}" "${bar}"
<abc><123>$

Another very consistent method is to use declare -p. The output of declare -p can be reused as input. However, not all variables and parameters can be printed using declare -p, for example, the values of the Special Parameters. The Special Parameter hash, "$#", reports how many Positional Parameters are currently defined.

$ declare -p foo bar
declare -- foo="abc"
declare -- bar="123"
$ set --
$ declare -p "$#"
bash: declare: 0: not found

For a full string of input at an interactive shell...

$ declare -p #

...the hash would be interpreted by Bash as an inline comment. With the comment and all text to the right of it removed, the command that Bash would execute would be declare -p. This command would, according to help declare, "display the values and attributes of each NAME," i.e., each variable, and, "if no NAMEs are given, display the values and attributes and values of all variables," which can be over 100 lines of output.

On the other hand, printf cannot display variables' attributes. See also § Debugging.

$ readonly fo
$ declare -p foo
declare -r foo="abc"
$ printf '<%s>' "${foo}"
<abc>$

=== Environment ===
Configurable execution environment(s): (Note: "Ch. 3.7.3 Command Execution Environment")

- Shell and session startup files such as ~/.bashrc and ~/.profile (i.e., dotfiles);
- Settings (set built-in) and shell options (shopt built-in) which alter shell behavior;

Shell and session startup Files (a.k.a., "dot files")

When Bash starts, it executes the commands in a variety of dot files. Unlike Bash shell scripts, dot files typically have neither the execute permission enabled nor an interpreter directive like #!/bin/bash.

- Legacy-compatible Bash startup example

The example ~/.bash_profile below is compatible with the Bourne shell and gives semantics similar to csh for the ~/.bashrc and ~/.bash_login. The [ -r filename ] && cmd is a short-circuit evaluation that tests if filename exists and is readable, skipping the part after the && if it is not.

[ -r ~/.profile ] && . ~/.profile             # set up environment, once, Bourne-sh syntax only
if [ -n "$PS1" ]; then                      # are we interactive?
   [ -r ~/.bashrc     ] && . ~/.bashrc        # tty/prompt/function setup for interactive shells
   [ -r ~/.bash_login ] && . ~/.bash_login    # any at-login tasks for login shell only
fi                                          # End of "if" block

- Operating system issues in Bash startup

Some versions of Unix and Linux contain Bash system startup scripts, generally under the /etc directory. Bash executes these files as part of its standard initialization, but other startup files can read them in a different order than the documented Bash startup sequence. The default content of the root user's files may also have issues, as well as the skeleton files the system provides to new user accounts upon setup. The startup scripts that launch the X window system may also do surprising things with the user's Bash startup scripts in an attempt to set up user-environment variables before launching the window manager. These issues can often be addressed using a ~/.xsession or ~/.xprofile file to read the ~/.profile — which provides the environment variables that Bash shell windows spawned from the window manager need, such as xterm or Gnome Terminal.

=== Standard streams ===
Standard streams - STDIN, STDOUT and STDERR

== Commands ==
=== Aliases ===
Aliases allow a string to be substituted for a word that is in a position in the input where it can be the first word of a simple command. Aliases have names and corresponding values that are set and unset using the alias and unalias builtin commands. (Note: "Ch. 6.6 Aliases")

— Brain fox, Vivek rana, The GNU Bash Reference Manual

=== Keywords and Reserved Words ===
- function
  - Bash function declarations which include this particular keyword are not compatible with Bourne/Korn/POSIX scripts, however, Bash does accepts the function declaration syntax used by Bourne, Korn and POSIX-compliant shells.

=== Functions ===
Shell functions are a way to group commands for later execution using a single name for the group. They are executed just like a "regular" simple command. When the name of a shell function is used as a simple command name, the shell executes the list of commands associated with that function name. Shell functions are executed in the current shell context; there is no new process created to interpret them. (Note: "Ch. 3.3 Shell Functions")

— The GNU Bash Reference Manual

=== Builtin commands ===
- Various Built-In Commands:
  - POSIX Special builtins: (Note: "Ch. 4.1 Bourne Shell Builtins")
    - cd, pwd, etc.
  - set
    - Xtrace: [ set -x | set -o xtrace ]. The shell's primary means of debugging. Both xtrace and verbose can be turned off at the same time with the command set -.
    - Verbose: [ set -v | set -o verbose ]. Prints a command to the terminal as Bash reads it. Bash reads constructs all at once, such as compound commands which include if-fi and case-esac blocks. If a set -v is included within a compound command, then "verbose" will be enabled the next time Bash reads code as input, i.e., after the end of the currently executing construct.
    - Both xtrace and verbose can be turned off at the same time with the command set -.
  - shopt
    - expand-aliases: On by default in interactive shells. Some developers discourage its use in scripts.

=== PATH and system commands ===
When the shell looks for external commands, it relies on the Bourne shell variable $PATH. $PATH contains a list of directories separated by colons, :. Beginning with the leftmost directory and selecting directories in a left to right pattern, each directory is searched until a match is found. In Linux, so that a user can locate additional commands, it's common practice for distribution administrators and package developers to alter the value of an end user's $PATH by including source files in /etc/profile.d and other locations.

When looking for the command, chmod, for instance, after considering internal commands and finding nothing, Bash will search the directories in $PATH and will select the absolute path of the first executable found that has a basename which matches the search string.

If there is more than one command echo available in the directories listed in $PATH, during the process of parsing and executing a commandline, by default only the first command found will be selected. $PATH lookups are slow. The shell speeds up the commandline execution process by remembering command locations in a hash table. To perform a full $PATH search without any interference from the hash table, remove the current table with hash -r and search for all kinds of commands with type -a.

$ # Force a full path search
$ PATH=${PATH}:${HOME}
$ printf 'echo script_file: "$@"\n' > ./echo
$ chmod 0700 ./echo
$ hash -r; type -a echo
echo is a shell builtin
echo is /usr/bin/echo
echo is /home/liveuser/echo

In order to execute a commandline with a command found later in the $PATH string, you can specify an absolute path or you can anchor path resolution relative to the current working directory.

$ /home/liveuser/echo foo
script_file: foo
$ ./echo bar
script_file: bar

For security reasons it is advisable to make sure the directories in PATH are not world-writeable, or are writeable only by root and trusted users.

=== Command lookup ===
- Command position: after expansions, the first word of the full text of the command line.
- Command name lookup is performed, in the following order:
  - Commands internal to the shell:
    - Shell aliases,
    - Shell reserved words,
    - Shell functions, and
    - Shell built-in commands;
  - Commands external to the shell, using the PATH shell variable:
    - Separate UNIX-style programs such as ls or ln, and
    - Shell scripts, which are files containing executable commands. (Note: Shell scripts do not require compilation before execution and, when certain requirements are met, can be invoked as commands by using their filename.)

== Control structures ==
=== Subshells ===
Subshells: (...);

=== Pipelines ===
However, by using a pipeline, they can engage in multiple cycles of computation at the same time, substantially increasing their speed. In a pipelined control unit, different instructions simultaneously go through the process but at different points. While one instruction is being fetched, a second is being decoded, and so forth. Unix-style pipelines: |.

=== Logical operators ===
- AND (&&)
- OR (||)
- NOT (!)

Bash supplies "conditional execution" command separators that make execution of a command contingent on the exit code set by a precedent command. For example:

$ cd "$SOMEWHERE" && ./do_something || echo "An error occurred" >&2

Where ./do_something is only executed if the cd (change directory) command was "successful" (returned an exit status of zero) and the echo command would only be executed if either the cd or the ./do_something command return an "error" (non-zero exit status).

=== Iteration ===
ITERATION: Sometimes programs are repeated indefinitely or until a specific outcome is reached. Each execution of the instructions is an "iteration."

- while, until, and select loop compound commands;
- Arithmetic C-style and list-enumerating for loop compound commands; and
- continue, break, return, and exit flow control commands;

=== Compound commands ===
compound: something formed by a union of elements or parts.

— Merriam-Webster's Collegiate Dictionary

Bash also supports if ... fi and case ... esac forms of conditional command evaluation. (Note: Concept drawn from ALGOL 68.)

=== Testing ===
Built in commands for testing file attributes, comparing string and integer values, etc.:

- Traditional test command,
- Traditional single bracket test: [,
- Modern double bracket test: [[...]], which includes advanced features:
  - Extended regular expression and extglob matching
  - Lexicographic comparisons with < and >;
- ((...)) numeric evaluation and testing; this includes almost all "C" language operators for arithmetic and numeric comparison;

For all commands the exit status is stored in the special variable $?.

=== Regular Expressions ===
Bash 3.0 supports in-process regular expression matching using a syntax reminiscent of Perl. Regexp matching is limited to strings on the right side of the =~ operator in the [[..]] extended test construct. (Note: "Ch. 3.2.5.2 Conditional Constructs")

[[ ${line} =~ [[:space:]]*(a)?b ]] means values for line like 'aab', ' aaaaaab', 'xaby', and ' ab' will all match, as will a line containing a 'b' anywhere in its value.

=== Coprocesses ===
A coprocess is a shell command preceded by the coproc reserved word. A coprocess is executed asynchronously in a subshell, as if the command had been terminated with the '&' control operator, with a two-way pipe established between the executing shell and the coprocess. (Note: "Ch. 3.2.6 Coprocesses")

— The GNU Bash Reference Manual

== Data manipulation ==
=== Word Splitting ===
Split into words (i.e., word splitting)

=== Quoting ===
When in doubt -- Quote!

— Mastering Linux Shell Scripting, by Andrew Mallett

Bash has certain quoting rules: uses of

- single quotes '...'
- double quotes "..."
- backslashes \, and
- ANSI-C quoting $'...'.

See also § Locales, $"..."

See also backticks `...`: § Deprecated syntax.

=== Unicode ===
Support for Unicode in echo -e and ANSI-C quoting.

=== Brace Expansion ===
$ echo kernel{,-headers}
kernel kernel-headers

Brace expansion, also called alternation, is a feature copied from the C shell. It generates a set of alternative combinations. (Note: "Ch. 5.3.1 Brace Expansion") Generated results need not exist as files. The results of each expanded string are not sorted and left to right order is preserved:

$ echo a{p,c,d,b}e
ape ace ade abe
$ echo {a,b,c}{d,e,f}
ad ae af bd be bf cd ce cf

Users should not use brace expansions in portable shell scripts, because the Bourne shell does not produce the same output.

$ # bash shell
$/bin/bash -c 'echo a{p,c,d,b}e'
ape ace ade abe
$ # A traditional shell does not produce the same output
$ /bin/sh -c 'echo a{p,c,d,b}e'
a{p,c,d,b}e

When brace expansion is combined with wildcards, the braces are expanded first, and then the resulting wildcards are substituted normally. Hence, a listing of JPEG and PNG images in the current directory could be obtained using:

ls *.{jpg,jpeg,png}    # expands to *.jpg *.jpeg *.png – after which,
                       # the wildcards are processed
echo *.{png,jp{e,}g}   # echo just shows the expansions –
                       # and braces in braces are possible.

In addition to alternation, brace expansion can be used for sequential ranges between two integers or characters separated by double dots. Newer versions of Bash allow a third integer to specify the increment.

$ echo {1..10}
1 2 3 4 5 6 7 8 9 10
$ echo {01..10}
01 02 03 04 05 06 07 08 09 10
$ echo file{1..4}.txt
file1.txt file2.txt file3.txt file4.txt
$ echo {a..e}
a b c d e
$ echo {1..10..3}
1 4 7 10
$ echo {a..j..3}
a d g j

When brace expansion is combined with variable expansion (a.k.a., parameter expansion and parameter substitution) the variable expansion is performed after the brace expansion, which in some cases may necessitate the use of the eval built-in, thus:

$ start=1; end=10
$ echo {$start..$end} # fails to expand due to the evaluation order
{1..10}
$ eval echo {$start..$end} # variable expansion occurs then resulting string is evaluated
1 2 3 4 5 6 7 8 9 10

=== Parameter and variable expansion ===
- Type
- Shell parameters
- Environment variables
- User variables
- Scope
- Arrays
  - Indexed arrays: size is unlimited.
  - Associative arrays: via declare -A. In February 2009, Bash 4.0 introduced support for associative arrays. Associative array indices are strings, in a manner similar to AWK or Tcl. They can be used to emulate multidimensional arrays.
- Parameter Expansion
  Expansion syntaxes which can perform some tasks more quickly than external utilities, including, among others:
  - Pattern Substitution
    - ${foo//x/y} for sed 's/x/y/g',
  - Remove Matching Prefix or Suffix Pattern
    - ${bar##[a-zA-Z0-9]*} for cut -c8-,
  - Enumerate Array Keys
    - ${!array[@]}, and
  - Display Error if Null or Unset
    - ${var:?error message},

=== Pathname expansion ===
Pathname expansion, i.e., shell-style globbing and pattern matching using *, ?, [...]. (Note: Although they can be used in conjunction, the use of brackets in pattern matching, [...], and the use of brackets in the testing commands, [ and [[ ... ]], are each one different things.)

=== Locales ===
Locale-specific translation via $"..." quoting syntax. (Note: "Ch. 3.1.2.5 Locale-Specific Translation")

== Process redirections and parsing ==
=== Command substitution ===
Command substitution: $(...),

=== Process substitution ===
Process substitution, <() or >(), when a system supports it:

Bash supports process substitution using the <(command) and >(command) syntax, which substitutes the output of (or input to) a command where a filename is normally used. (This is implemented through /proc/fd/ unnamed pipes on systems that support that, or via temporary named pipes where necessary).

=== Arithmetic evaluation ===
Arithmetic command, ((...)) or arithmetic expansion $((...)), including

- Integer arithmetic in any base from two to sixty-four, although
- Floating-point arithmetic is not available from within the shell itself (for this functionality, see current versions of bc and awk, among others),

Bash can perform integer calculations ("arithmetic evaluation") without spawning external processes. It uses the ((...)) command and the $((...)) expansion syntax for this purpose.

=== Redirection ===
Redirections of Standard Input, Standard Output and Standard Error data streams are performed, including

- File writing, >, and appending, >>,
- Here documents, <<,
- Here strings, <<<, which allow parameters to be used as input, and
- A redirection operator, >|, which can force overwriting of a file when a shell's noclobber setting is enabled;

Its syntax simplifies I/O redirection. For example, it can redirect standard output (stdout) and standard error (stderr) at the same time using the &> operator. This is simpler to type than the Bourne shell equivalent 'command > file 2>&1'. Bash supports here documents. Since version 2.05b Bash can redirect standard input (stdin) from a "here string" using the <<< operator.

=== Command parsing ===
1. Comments are ignored, from an unquoted # (hash) to the end of the same line;
2. Commands are parsed one line at a time:
  - Control structures are honored, and
  - Backslash \ escapes are also honored at the ends of lines;
3. Split into words (i.e., word splitting) according to quoting rules,
  - Including ANSI-C quoting $'...';
4. Seven types of expansions are performed in the following order on the resulting string:
  1. (Type 1) Brace expansion kernel{-headers},
  2. (Type 2) Tilde expansion ~,
  3. In a left-to-right fashion:
    - (Type 3) Parameter and variable expansion $foo or ${bar}, including
    - (Type 4) Command substitution: $(...),
    - (Type 5) Process substitution, <() or >(), when a system supports it:
    - (Type 6) Arithmetic expansion, ((...)) or $((...)), including
      - Integer arithmetic in any base from two to sixty-four, although
      - Floating-point arithmetic is not available from within the shell itself. (Note: For this functionality, see current versions of bc and awk, among others.)
  4. Word splitting (again),
  5. (Type 7) Pathname expansion, i.e., shell-style globbing and pattern matching using *, ?, [...],
  6. Quote removal;
5. Redirections of Standard Input, Standard Output and Standard Error data streams are performed. See also § Redirection, above.
6. Command name lookup is performed. See also § Command lookup, above.
7. The resulting string is executed as a command.

== Interactive-only features ==
=== Command History ===
Unlimited size command history. This feature is available in interactive mode only. (Note: "Ch. 9 Using History Interactively")

=== Directory stack ===
A directory stack (pushd and popd built-ins) feature is available in interactive mode only.

=== Programmable completion ===
Also known as "tab completion" or "command-line completion", when a user presses the Tab ↹, within an interactive command-shell Bash automatically uses any available completion scripts to suggest partly typed program names, filenames and variable names. (Note: "Ch. 8.6 Programmable Completion") The Bash command-line completion system is very flexible and customizable, and is often packaged with functions that complete arguments and filenames for specific programs and tasks.

Bash supports programmable completion via built-in complete, compopt, and compgen commands. The feature has been available since the beta version of 2.04 released in 2000.

These commands enable complex and intelligent completion specification for commands (i.e., installed programs), functions, variables, and filenames.

The complete and compopt two commands specify how arguments of some available commands or options are going to be listed in the readline input.As of version 5.1 completion of the command or the option is usually activated by the Tab keystroke after typing its name. This feature is available in interactive mode only.

=== Prompts ===
Configurable prompts. This feature is available in interactive mode only.

== Documentation ==
=== User Manual ===
A "user manual" for Bash is provided by the GNU Project. It is sometimes considered to be a more user-friendly document than the man page. "You may also find information about Bash ...by looking at /usr/share/doc/bash, /usr/local/share/doc/bash, or similar directories on your system." On GNU/Linux systems, if the info program is available then the GNU Manual version relevant for your installation should also be available at info bash.

=== Man page ===
The most recent technical manual, or "man page", is intended to be the authoritative explanatory technical document for the understanding of how bash operates. On GNU/Linux systems, the version relevant for your installation is usually available through the man program at man bash.

=== help builtin ===
With recent versions of Bash, information on shell built-in commands can be found by executing help, help [name of builtin] or man builtins at a terminal prompt where bash is installed.

The printf command can be invoked via env to ensure that you run the program found via your shell's search path, and not a shell alias or built-in function: env printf --help.

=== POSIX Specification ===
For the purpose of allowing inter-operability among different shell programs running on different operating systems, the "POSIX Specification" influences how modern UNIX-like shells are written. Bash "is intended to be a conformant implementation of the IEEE POSIX "Shell and Utilities" portion of the IEEE POSIX specification (IEEE Standard 1003.1)." (Note: "Ch. 1.1 What is Bash?") The most recent publication of the standard (2024) is available online.

As the standard upon which bash is based, the POSIX Standard, or IEEE Std 1003.1, is especially informative.

=== Further Resources ===
"The project maintainer also has a Bash page which includes Frequently Asked Questions", this FAQ is current as of bash version 5.1 and is no longer updated.

Informal avenues of support are available via IRC at libera.chat, in the #bash channel, and mailing lists are available.

== Security and vulnerabilities ==
=== Root scripts ===
Running any shell scripts as the root user has, for years, been widely criticized as poor security practice. One commonly given reason is that, when a script is executed as root, the negative effects of any bugs in a script would be magnified by root's elevated privileges.

One common example: a script contains the command, rm -rf ${dir}/, but the variable $dir is left undefined. In Linux, if the script was executed by a regular user, the shell would attempt to execute the command rm -rf / as a regular user, and the command would fail. However, if the script was executed by the root user, then the command would likely succeed and the filesystem would be erased.

It is recommended to use sudo on a per-command basis instead.

=== CGI scripts ===
CGI scripts are a significant source of vulnerability.

=== builtin eval ===
"The eval command is extremely powerful and extremely easy to abuse."

=== Input validation ===
"Input validation is the process of ensuring data has undergone data cleansing to confirm it has data quality, that is, that it is both correct and useful."

Input validation is performed to ensure only properly formed data is entering the workflow in an information system, preventing malformed data from persisting in the database and triggering malfunction of various downstream components. Input validation should happen as early as possible in the data flow, preferably as soon as the data is received from the external party.

— OWASP Input Validation Cheat Sheet

=== Shellshock ===
In September 2014, a security bug was discovered in the program. It was dubbed "Shellshock." Public disclosure quickly led to a range of attacks across the Internet.

Exploitation of the vulnerability could enable arbitrary code execution in CGI scripts executable by certain versions of Bash. The bug involved how Bash passed function definitions to subshells through environment variables. The bug had been present in the source code since August 1989 (version 1.03) and was patched in September 2014 (version 4.3).

Patches to fix the bugs were made available soon after the bugs were identified. Upgrading to a current version is strongly advised.

It was assigned the Common Vulnerability identifiers CVE-2014-6271, CVE-2014-6277 and CVE-2014-7169, among others. Under CVSS Metrics 2.x and 3.x, the bug is regarded as "high" and "critical", respectively.

== Deprecated syntax ==
- Backtick style command substitutions: `...` is deprecated (Note: "The standard form of command substitution occurs when a command is enclosed as follows: $(command) or (deprecated) `command`." (Note: "Ch. 3.5.4 Command Substitution")) in favor of:
  - $(...);
- Use of -a or -o in test/[/[[ commands,
  - for example, [ -r ./file -a ! -l ./file ] is deprecated (Note: "The historical operator-precedence parsing with 4 or more arguments can lead to ambiguities when it encounters strings that look like primaries. The POSIX standard has deprecated the -a and -o primaries and enclosing expressions within parentheses. Scripts should no longer use them. It’s much more reliable to restrict test invocations to a single primary, and to replace uses of -a and -o with the shell’s && and \|\| list operators." (Note: "Ch. 4.1 Bourne Shell Builtins":test)) in favor of:
    - [ -r ./file ] && ! [ -l ./file ];
- Use of the arithmetic syntax $[...] is deprecated (Note: "It dates from Posix circa 1990 (1003.2d9, of which I've lost my paper copy). I implemented it after the Berkeley guys, mostly Marc Teitelbaum, put it into Posix. It ended up getting dropped in favor of the ksh $((...)) expansion, at which point everyone deprecated the old $[...].") in favor of:
  - $((...)) or
  - ((...)), as appropriate;
- Use of ^ as a pipeline is deprecated (Note: "Note that the reason it's [!x] instead of [^x] is that ^ was a pipe operator in the Thompson/Bourne shell. ... (to clarify, ^ (which looked more like a ↑ at the time) was a pipe operator in the Thompson shell.... [!...] was likely introduced by the Bourne shell (which used \| as pipe operator but kept ^ as well for backward compatibility)") in favor of |;

== Debugging ==
=== Table of features ===
Bash features which can be useful during debugging.
Feature			POSIX 2024	Description	Bash ver.
Grammar type	Formal name	Syntax	POSIX 2024	Description	Bash ver.
Special Built-In Utility	set / xtrace	set -x	Yes	The shell's primary means of debugging. It "writes to standard error a trace for each command after it expands the command and before it executes it."	?
Special Parameters	Exit Status	"$?"	Yes	"Expands to the shortest representation of the decimal exit status."	?
Parameter Expansions	Indicate Null or Unset	"${parameter:?[word]}"	Yes	"Where the expansion of [word], perhaps an error message or a line number, is written to standard error and the shell exits with a non-zero exit code."	?
Special Parameters	PID of Invoked Shell	"$$"	Yes	"Expands to the shortest representation of the decimal process ID of the invoked shell."	?
Special Built-In Utility	set / verbose	set -v	Yes	"Writes its input to standard error as it is read."	?
Special Built-In Utility	set / pipefail	set -o pipefail	Yes	"Derive the exit status of a pipeline from the exit statuses of all of the commands in the pipeline, not just the last (rightmost) command."	?
Special Built-In Utility	set / nounset	set -u	Yes	When enabled, will cause the shell to exit with an error message when it encounters an unset variable expansion. Its use has a number of counter-intuitive pitfalls.	?
Special Built-In Utility	set / errexit	set -e	Yes	Errexit is a setting that, when enabled, will, under certain very specific conditions, cause the shell to exit without an error message whenever the shell receives a non-zero exit code. Its use is somewhat controversial, to the extent that any somewhat obscure computer program can be controversial. Adherents claim that Errexit provides an assurance of verifiability in situations where shell scripts "must not fail." However, opponents claim that its use is unreliable, deceptively simple, highly counter-intuitive, rife with gotchas and pitfalls, and in essence "security theater." Numerous developers of Bash have strongly discouraged the use of this particular setting.	?
Special Built-In Utility	trap / EXIT	trap '[arg]' EXIT	Yes	"If a signal specifier is 0 or EXIT, [arg] is executed when the shell exits." If [arg] contains expansions, then [arg] should be in single quotes.	?
Utility	printf	printf '<%s>\n' "${var}"	Yes	A means of reliably printing the contents of a variable.	?
Bash Variables	BASHPID	"${BASHPID}"	No	"Expands to the process ID of the current bash process."	?
Bash Variables	BASH_ARGC	"${BASH_ARGC[@]}"	No	"An array variable whose values are the number of parameters in each frame of the current bash execution call stack."	?
Bash Variables	BASH_ARGV	"${BASH_ARGV[@]}"	No	"An array variable containing all of the parameters in the current bash execution call stack."	?
Bash Variables	BASH_LINENO	"${BASH_LINENO[@]}"	No	"An array variable whose members are the line numbers in source files where each corresponding member of "${FUNCNAME[@]}" was invoked."	?
Bash Variables	BASH_REMATCH	"${BASH_REMATCH[@]}"	No	"An array variable whose members are assigned by the =~ binary operator to the [[ conditional command."	?
Bash Variables	BASH_SOURCE	"${BASH_SOURCE[@]}"	No	"An array variable whose members are the source filenames where the corresponding shell function names in the "${FUNCNAME[@]}" array variable are defined."	?
Bash Variables	BASH_XTRACEFD	"${BASH_XTRACEFD}"	No	"If set to an integer corresponding to a valid file descriptor, Bash will write the trace output generated when set -x is enabled to that file descriptor."	?
Bash Variables	EPOCHREALTIME	"${EPOCHREALTIME}"	No	"Each time this parameter is referenced, it expands to the number of seconds since the Unix Epoch (see time(3)) as a floating point value with micro-second granularity."	?
Bash Variables	FUNCNAME	"${FUNCNAME[@]}"	No	"An array variable containing the names of all shell functions currently in the execution call stack."	?
Bash Variables	LINENO	"${LINENO}"	No	"Each time this parameter is referenced, the shell substitutes a decimal number representing the current sequential line number (starting with 1) within a script or function."	?
Bash Variables	PIPESTATUS	"${PIPESTATUS[@]}"	No	"An array variable containing a list of exit status values from the processes in the most-recently-executed foreground pipeline (which may contain only a single command)."	?
Bash Variables	PPID	"${PPID}"	No	"The process ID of the shell's parent."	?
Bash Variables	PS4	"${PS4}"	No	"The value of this parameter is expanded as with PS1 and the value is printed before each command bash displays during an execution trace."	?
Shell Builtin	set / restricted	set -r	No	Restricted mode is intended to improve the security of an individual shell instance from a malicious human with physical access to a machine. As threat models have changed, it has become less commonly used now than it once was.	?
Shell Builtin	shopt / extdebug	shopt -s extdebug	No	"Behavior intended for use by debuggers."	?
Shell Builtin	trap / DEBUG	trap '[arg]' DEBUG	No	"If a sigspec is DEBUG, the command arg is executed before" certain kinds of commands.	?
Shell Builtin	trap / ERR	trap '[arg]' ERR	No	"If a sigspec is ERR, the command arg is executed whenever..." certain kinds of commands "return a non-zero exit status", subject to similar restrictions as with ErrExit.	?
Shell Builtin	trap / RETURN	trap '[arg]' RETURN	No	"If a sigspec is RETURN, the command arg is executed each time a shell function or a script executed with the . or source builtins finishes executing."	?

- Shell features specified by POSIX:
  - Shell Parameter Expansion (Note: "Ch. 3.5.3 Shell Parameter Expansion")
  - Special Parameters: (Note: "Ch. 3.4.2 Special Parameters")
  - Special Built-In Utility set:
  - Special Built-In Utility trap: (Note: "Ch. 4.1 Bourne Shell Builtins:trap")
    - POSIX does specify certain uses of the trap builtin: ...
  - Utility printf: a means of reliably printing the contents of a variable:
- Bash features not specified by POSIX:
  - Bash Variables: (Note: "Ch. 5.2 Bash Variables")
  - Shell Builtin set:
  - Shell Builtin shopt: (Note: "Ch. 4.3.2 The Shopt Builtin")
  - Shell Builtin trap: (Note: "Ch. 4.1 Bourne Shell Builtins:trap")
    - While POSIX does specify certain uses of the trap builtin, the following signal specs are Bash extensions: ...
- Third party debugging utilities:
  - ShellCheck: Shell script analysis tool;

  - devscripts-checkbashisms: Check whether a /bin/sh script contains any common bash-specific constructs;
  - kcov: Code coverage tool without special compilation options;
  - Bashdb: The Bash symbolic debugger.

==== Examples ====
With the "${var:?}" parameter expansion, an unset or null variable can halt a script.

$ cat ex.sh
#! /bin/env bash
bar="foo is not defined"
echo "${foo:?$bar}"
echo this message does not print
$ chmod 0700 ./ex.sh
$ ./ex.sh
./ex.sh: line 3: foo: foo is not defined

Reliably printing the contents of an array that contains spaces and newlines first in a portable syntax, and then the same thing in Bash. Note that POSIX doesn't have named array, only the list of arguments, "$@", which can be re-set by the set builtin.

$ bash -o posix
$ set -- "a" " b" " 
>  c "
$ printf ',%s,\n' "$@" | sed 's/.*/|&|/''
|,a,|
|, b,|
|, |
| c ,|

Note that in Bash, the number of spaces before the newline is made clear.

$ array=( "a" " b" " 
>  c " )
$ declare -p array
declare -a array=([0]="a" [1]=" b" [2]=$' \n c ')

Printing an error message when there's a problem.

$ cat error.sh
#! /bin/env bash
if ! ls -l /dev | grep sdz
then
  echo Error, line "${LINENO}"
fi
$ chmod 0700 ./error.sh
$ ./error.sh
Error, line 4

Using xtrace. If errexit had been enabled, then echo quux would not have been executed.

$ cat ./test.sh
#! /bin/env bash
echo foo
false
echo quux
$ chmod 0700 ./test.sh
$ bash -o xtrace -o errexit ./test.sh
+ echo foo
foo
+ false
$ bash -o xtrace ./test.sh
+ echo foo
foo
+ false
+ echo quux
quux

Note: $BASHPID differs from $$ in certain circumstances, such as subshells that do not require bash to be reinitialized.

$ echo $(echo $BASHPID $$)   $$    $BASHPID
              25680    16920 16920 16920
#             |        |     |     |
#             |        |     |     \-- $BASHPID outside of the subshell
#             |        |     \-- $$ outside of the subshell
#             |        \-- $$ inside of the subshell
#             \-- $BASHPID inside of the subshell

=== Bug reporting ===
An external command called bashbug reports Bash shell bugs. When the command is invoked, it brings up the user's default editor with a form to fill in. The form is mailed to the Bash maintainers (or optionally to other email addresses).

== History ==
Shell script functionality originated with files called "runcoms" in reference to the 1963 macro processor of the same name. The suffix "rc" is short for "runcom." The term "shell" was coined by Louis Pouzin in 1964 or 1965, and appeared in his 1965 paper, "The SHELL: A Global Tool for Calling and Chaining Procedures in the System," which describes many features later found in many UNIX shells. The ASCII standard for character encoding was defined in 1969 in a document called Request for Comments (RFC) 20.

=== Timeline ===
Significant events in Bash history are listed below:

Date	Event
1988-01-10	Brian Fox began coding Bash after Richard Stallman became dissatisfied with the lack of progress being made by a prior developer. Stallman and the FSF considered a free shell that could run existing shell scripts so strategic to a completely free system built from BSD and GNU code that this was one of the few projects they funded themselves. Fox undertook the work as an employee of FSF.
1989-06-08	Fox released Bash as a beta, version 0.99. The license was GPL-1.0-or-later. "In addition to supporting backward-compatibility for scripting, Bash has incorporated features from the Korn and C shells. You'll find command history, command-line editing, a directory stack (pushd and popd), many useful environment variables, command completion, and more." Eventually it supported "regular expressions (similar to Perl), and associative arrays".
1991	Bash holds historical significance as one of the earliest programs ported to Linux by Linus Torvalds, alongside the GNU Compiler (GCC).
1992 ~ 1994	Brian Fox retired as the primary maintainer sometime between mid-1992 and mid-1994. His responsibility was transitioned to another early contributor, Chet Ramey. Since then, Bash has become the most popular default interactive shell among the major GNU/Linux distributions, such as Fedora, Debian, and openSUSE, as well as among their derivatives and competitors.
1994-01-26	Debian – initial release. Bash is the default interactive and non-interactive shell.
1996-12-31	Chet Ramey released bash 2.0. The license was GPL-2.0-or-later
1997-06-05	Bash 2.01 released.
1998-04-18	Bash 2.02 released.
1999-02-19	Bash 2.03 released.
2000-03-21	Bash 2.04 released.
2000-09-14	Bug-bash mailing list exists.
2001-04-09	Bash 2.05 released.
2003	Bash became the default shell on Apple's operating systems (i.e., MacOS) starting with OS X 10.3 Panther. (Note: "Using an sh-derived shell like bash (the default for new users in Panther)....") It was available on OS X 10.2 Jaguar as well where the default shell was tcsh. (Note: "Versions of that environment prior to 10.3.X used tcsh, or T shell, as the default.")
2004-07-27	Bash 3.0 released.
2005-12-09	Bash 3.1 released.
2006-10-12	Bash 3.2 released. The license was GPL-2.0-or-later.
2006	Ubuntu replace bash with dash as its default shell.
2009-02-20	Bash 4.0 released Its license is GPL-3.0-or-later.
2010-01-02	Bash 4.1 released.
2011-02-14	Bash 4.2 released.
2012	On Solaris 11, "the default user shell is the Bourne-again (bash) shell."
2014-02-27	Bash 4.3 released.
2014-09-08	Shellshock (software bug). Patches to fix the bugs were made available soon after the bugs were identified.
2015	Termux and other terminal emulation applications provide availability of Bash on Android.
2016-09-15	Bash 4.4 released.
2009 ~ 2018	Apple declines to accept version 4 of Bash being licensed under version 3 of the GNU GPL, and ceases to supply upgrades to Bash beyond version 3.2 (as supplied in MacOS Mojave).
2019-06-05	Apple declares zsh its default shell and supplies version 5.7 in its Catalina release of MacOS.
2019-01-07	Bash 5.0 released.
2020-12-07	Bash 5.1 released.
2022-09-26	Bash 5.2 released.
2025	Bash 5.3 released.

== See also ==
- Comparison of command shells
- Multics § Commands, exec_com: the first command processor.
- FTP download from GNU Project of Bash versions 1.14.0 to current.

=== Unix shells ===
- Almquist shell (ash)
  - Debian-Almquist shell (dash)
- Bourne shell (sh)
- BusyBox
- C shell (csh)
- Fish (Friendly Interactive Shell)
  - nsh – command-line shell like fish, but POSIX compatible
- Google Shell (goosh) – UNIX-like front-end for Google Search
- KornShell (ksh) – has many variants
- osh (Oil Shell) – Bash-compatible UNIX command-line shell; available on Arch Linux
- PWB shell (Mashey or Programmer's Workbench shell)
- Qshell – for IBM i
- rc – from Plan 9
- RUNCOM
- rush (Restricted User Shell) – available on Debian
- Stand-alone shell (sash)
- scsh (The Scheme Shell)
- tcsh (TENEX C shell)
- Thompson shell (tsh)
- Toybox
- yash (Yet Another Shell) – aims "to be the most POSIX-compliant shell in the world"; available on Arch Linux
- Z shell (zsh)

=== Graphical interface to scripts ===
There are many programs that allow you to create a graphical interface for shell scripts.

- curses - curses is a terminal control library for Unix-like systems, enabling the construction of text user interfaces (TUI) applications.
- dialog - is a utility that allows you to create dialog boxes in the console, using the curses and ncurses libraries.
- gtkdialog - is the most functional utility for creating graphical applications on bash scripts.
- kdialog - is a KDE equivalent of zenity.
- ncurses - a programming library for creating textual user interfaces (TUI's) that work across a wide variety of terminals.
- whiptail - is an analogue of the dialog utility, it uses the newt library.
- xdialog - is a replacement for dialog that is designed to give programs launched from the terminal an X Window System interface.
- yad - is a fork of zenity, with more features.
- zenity - is the most popular application for creating a graphical interface for scripts.
