= GPM =

GPM may refer to:

- GPM (software), software providing support for mouse devices in Linux virtual consoles
- Graphical path method, a mathematically based algorithm used in project management
- Gallons per minute, a unit of volumetric flow rate
- Gallons per mile, a unit of fuel efficiency
- Gaurela-Pendra-Marwahi district, Chhattisgarh, India
- General Purpose Macrogenerator, an early macro processor
- Global Marshall Plan, specific ideas on how to save the global environment
- Global Precipitation Measurement, a NASA and Japan Aerospace Exploration Agency project to measure global rainfall
- Graduated payment mortgage, a type of loan
- Graham Patrick Martin, an American actor
- Grand Prairie Municipal Airport, a public-use airfield in Grand Prairie, Texas, United States (Federal Aviation Administration identification code)
- Grand Prix Masters, an auto racing series for retired Formula One drivers
- Green Party of Manitoba, Canadian political party
- Gross profit margin, a calculation of revenue and cost of products
- Protestant Church in the Moluccas, a church denomination in the Indonesian provinces of Maluku and North Maluku, which in Indonesian is referred to as "Gereja Protestan Maluku"
- Google Play Music, a cloud media player by Google
- King of the Mountains competitions in cycle racing, derived from Gran Premio della Montagna (Italian) or Gran Premio de la montaña (Spanish)
