= Cavo (disambiguation) =

Cavo is an American hard rock band from St. Louis, Missouri.

== Geography ==
- Monte Cavo second highest mountain of the complex of the Alban Hills, near Rome, Italy
- Cavo, village in Isle of Elba, Tuscany
- fr:Cavo, French spelling for Cavu river on Corsica

== People ==
- Andrés Cavo (1739-1803) Jesuit historian of New Spain
- John de lo Cavo (Italian: Giovanni de lo Cavo) Genoese pirate captain who entered the service of the Byzantine emperor Michael VIII

== Acronyms ==
- California Association of Voting Officials (CAVO)

== See also ==
- Cavos, an Italian family
- Cavo-tricuspid isthmus body of fibrous tissue in the lower right atrium between the inferior vena cava, and the tricuspid valve.
