= Donal Fox =

- Born: July 17, 1952 (age 73); Boston, Massachusetts, U.S.
- Genres: Jazz, classical, Latin
- Occupations: Musician, composer
- Instrument: Piano
- Labels: New World, Evidence, Music & Arts, Passin' Thru, Wergo
- Website: donalfox.com

Donal Fox (born July 17, 1952) is an American composer, pianist and improviser in the jazz and classical genres. He was the first African-American composer-in-residence with the St. Louis Symphony (1991–1992).

In 1993 he was a visiting artist at Harvard University. From 2009–2011, he was Martin Luther King Jr. Visiting Scholar at the Massachusetts Institute of Technology. Donal Fox is a Steinway Artist.

Fox's works have been performed at Carnegie Hall. The concerto "Peace Out" for Improvised Piano and Orchestra was premiered at Zankel Hall in 2009, where Fox was the piano soloist. "Peace Out" was commissioned and performed by the American Composers Orchestra. His piece, "Hear De Lambs A-Cryin," was performed at Stern Auditorium in 2011 by the Albany Symphony Orchestra.

== Awards and honors ==
He received a 1997 Guggenheim Fellowship in music composition and a 1998 Fellowship from the Bogliasco Foundation.

In 2008, Fox was awarded the American Academy of Arts and Letters Academy Award in Music.

== Relatives ==
Donal Fox is the eldest of six siblings. His brother Brian Fox is a computer programmer and the original author of GNU Bash shell. Donal is the paternal grandson of artist Daniel Fox, creator of the Monopoly Man.
