= CDK =

CDK may refer to:

- CDK Global, a US-based automotive dealer services company
- The IATA airport code for George T. Lewis Airport, Cedar Key, Florida, United States
- Charles De Ketelaere, a Belgian professional footballer
- Chemistry Development Kit, an open source chemical expert system for chemoinformatics and bioinformatics, written in Java
- Chronic kidney disease, a progressive loss of function of the kidney
- Chung Do Kwan, founded in 1944, the first of nine schools teaching what came to be known as Taekwondo
- Complete knock-down, a production technique, often used in automotive industry
- Curses Development Kit, one of two open source distributions of the Curses widgets library
- Cyclin-dependent kinase, a major class of enzymes involved in the regulation of the cell cycle
