= Moused =

Mouse daemon on FreeBSD systems

moused is a mouse daemon on FreeBSD systems that works with the console driver to support mouse operations in the text console and user programs. It first appeared in FreeBSD 2.2 and is currently located in /usr/sbin/moused.

== Function ==
The mouse daemon listens to a mouse port (by default, /dev/psm0) and supplies mouse data to a virtual mouse driver, sysmouse(4). A user process that wants to use the mouse simply opens /dev/sysmouse and reads from it like a normal file. This makes it possible for the console and user processes such as the X Window System to share the mouse. PS2 mice will not need configuration while serial-port mice will.

Multiple mice can be used at once by starting multiple moused instances.

== See also ==
- GPM
