= Brian Fox (programmer) =

American computer programmer

Brian Jhan Fox
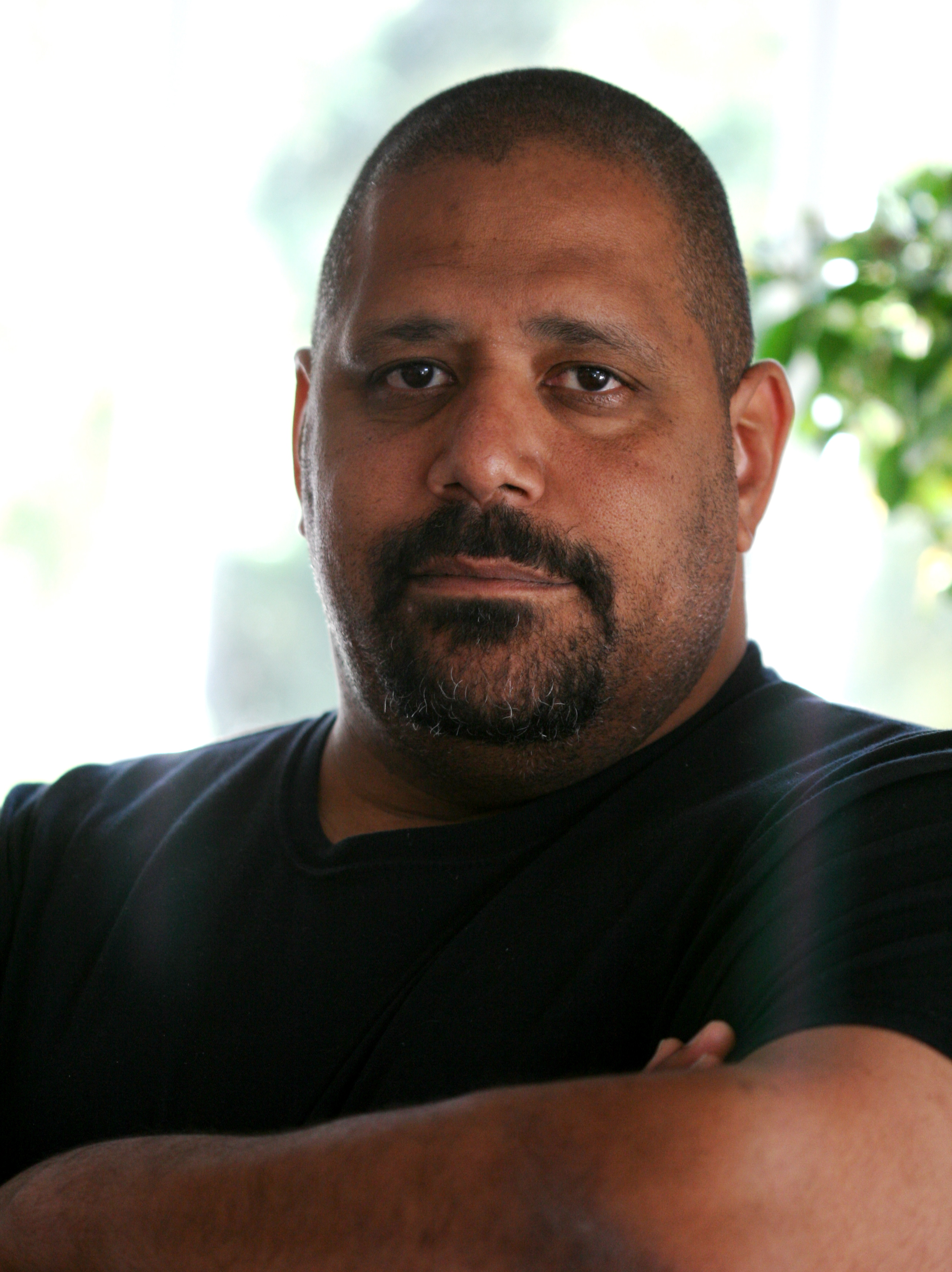
- Fox in 2008
- Born: December 11, 1959 (age 66); Boston, Massachusetts, U.S.
- Occupations: Computer programmer; technologist; author
- Employer: abk labs
- Known for: GNU Bash
- Relatives: Donal Fox (brother)

Brian Jhan Fox (born 1959) is an American computer programmer and free software advocate. He is the original author of the GNU Bash shell, which he announced as a beta in June 1989. He continued as the primary maintainer of Bash until at least early 1993. Fox also built the first interactive online banking software in the U.S. for Wells Fargo in 1995, and he created an open source election system in 2008. Fox has co-founded several technology start-ups including Orchid Labs, a provider of anonymized internet marketplaces.

== Free Software Foundation ==
In 1985, Fox worked with Richard Stallman at Stallman's newly created Free Software Foundation (FSF). At the FSF, Fox authored GNU Bash, GNU Makeinfo, GNU Info, GNU Finger, GNU Echo and the readline and history libraries.

He was also the maintainer of GNU Emacs for a time, making many contributions to the software which was created and maintained for the GNU Project between 1986 and 1994.

== Open source election systems ==
In 2008, Fox collaborated with Alan Dechert and Brent Turner to create a completely open source election system. The system was coded together with Parker Abercrombie, and demonstrated at the LinuxWorld conference in Moscone Center in San Francisco, August 5–7, 2008.

Fox is also a founding member of both the California Association of Voting Officials (CAVO) and the National Association of Voting Officials (NAVO). These not-for-profit organizations promote open source voting systems for use in public elections. Fox co-wrote a New York Times piece in 2015 with former CIA head R. James Woolsey advocating open source election systems as a means of securing US elections against interference from foreign actors.

== Other software ==
Fox also wrote AMACS, a cut-down implementation of Emacs for the Apple II.

== Relatives ==
He is the fourth-born in a family of six siblings: composer and musician Donal Fox, Thaddeus Fox, sister Ena Fox, Daniel Fox and sister Sara Fox-Ray. He is the son of physicist and educator Herbert Fox and grandson of artist Daniel Fox, creator of the Monopoly Man.
