= Zenity =

Free software for dialog boxes

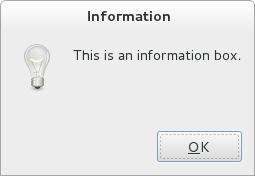
- Example of a Zenity dialog box
- Original author: Sun Microsystems
- Developers: Glynn Foster; Lucas Rocha
- Stable release: 4.2.1 / 7 November 2025; 4 months ago
- Operating system: Unix-like
- License: GNU Lesser General Public License
- Website: gitlab.gnome.org/GNOME/zenity
- Repository: gitlab.gnome.org/GNOME/zenity.git

Zenity is a free software and cross-platform computer program that allows the execution of GTK dialog boxes in command-line and shell scripts.

== Description ==
Like tools such as whiptail and dialog, Zenity allows easy creation of GUIs, though it has fewer features than more complex GUI-creation tools.

Other scripting languages such as Perl and Python can be used to construct full-scale GUI applications, but the zenity program enables a shell script to interact with a GUI user.... [The] user interface is not as refined as one that could be provided by a full-featured GUI application, but it is perfectly suitable for simple interactions.

— Chris Tyler

== Cross-platform compatibility ==
As of 2012, Zenity is available for Linux, BSD and Windows. A Zenity port to Mac OS X is available in MacPorts and Homebrew.

As of 2018, Zenity ports for Windows are available: zenity-windows (based on version 3.20.0) and winzenity (based on 3.8.0 / statically linked)

Zenity does not possess any built-in scripting capabilities and it must, therefore, rely on an interpreter for processing. One option is Python in combination with the PyZenity library.

== Examples ==
=== Python example ===
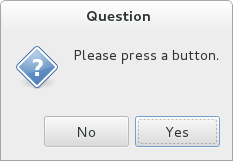

from PyZenity import InfoMessage
from PyZenity import Question
from PyZenity import ErrorMessage

choice = Question("Please press a button.")

if choice:
    InfoMessage("You pressed Yes!")
else:
    ErrorMessage("You pressed No!")

=== POSIX shell script example ===
#!/bin/sh

if zenity --question --text="Please press a button."; then
zenity --info --text="You pressed Yes\!"
else
zenity --error --text="You pressed No\!"
fi

=== Windows shell script example ===
@echo off
zenity --question --ok-label="Yes" --cancel-label="No" --text="Please press a button."
if %ERRORLEVEL% == 1 goto error
zenity --info --text="You pressed Yes!"
goto end
:error
zenity --error --text="You pressed No!"
:end

== See also ==
- GTK-server
- Dialog
- List of GNOME applications
