= California Association of Voting Officials =

US non-profit organization

California Association of Voting Officials (CAVO) is a non-profit organization that works with community members and voting officials to develop open source voting systems for use in public elections. In addition, CAVO provides training and education to election officials for the effective employment of open source voting technologies and management practices. Utilizing proprietary software and hardware, current voting systems have been reported as being riddled with shortcomings and "...affected by critical flaws" in testing, certification, accuracy, accessibility, and security, while exhibiting a lack of transparency and conflicts of interest. CAVO 's intent is to develop secure and transparent voting systems to ensure accurate vote counts coupled with the utmost in security by utilizing free open source software and commercial off-the-shelf (COTS) commodity components.

== Overview of voting systems ==
Voting systems across the United States garnered public and media attention during the 2000 United States presidential election—commonly referred to as "the year of the hanging chad"—after failing paper-based punch machines recorded 172,000 "mis-votes". After numerous recounts and the eventual interceding by the Supreme Court, jurisdictions across the country replaced manual voting machines with computerized systems. These systems have been reported as running "largely on 1990s computer designs" and are "now so antiquated (they are) in danger of breaking down". The Brennan Center for Justice, a nonpartisan law and policy institute, recently published a report on the current state of crisis regarding America's elections, citing serious security and reliability flaws. While the report does not mention open source voting software, it does highlight the use of COTS components as an affordable alternative to proprietary hardware. The cities of Los Angeles and San Francisco, the latter under CAVO's guiding expertise, are planning on replacing their outdated systems with open source voting technology and COTS hardware, with plans for both systems to be up and running in time for the 2020 elections.

== Founding and focus in California ==
CAVO was formed in December 2013 following the passing of legislation (SB360) penned by California Secretary of State Alex Padilla which paved the way for open source election systems in California. Reinforcing the Help America Vote Act is an important area of CAVO's work, particularly in ensuring that all registered voters have the same opportunity for access and participation in elections. Recognizing the work by predecessor Open Voting Consortium (OVC), CAVO continues to work toward creating funding and resources for the certification and implementation of affordable and secure voting systems that are reliable, trustworthy, more easily auditable, and more convenient to use by voters of all abilities. OVC dissolved in 2011, and CAVO has now taken the lead on open source voting projects in San Francisco County and other counties throughout the state.

== CAVO's input in New Hampshire ==
Most recently, New Hampshire Secretary of State William M. Gardner, directly and actively supported by CAVO, utilized open source software and COTS hardware during the 2014 State Primary and General election, reporting great success, particularly in regards to improved accessibility for voters with disabilities. As a result, open source voting systems will be used throughout the state of New Hampshire in the 2016 Presidential election. New Hampshire's open source voting software is called one4all and is based on the Prime III system developed by CAVO Advisory Board member Dr. Juan E. Gilbert.

== Board of Directors, past and present ==
Members of CAVO's Board of Directors include Brian D. Newby, Executive Director of the U.S. Election Assistance Commission, and Brian Fox, creator of Bash (Unix shell). Kammi Foote, elected Registrar of Voters for Inyo County and former President of CAVO, continues to advocate for voting systems that utilize open source software. CAVO Secretary Brent Turner is known as a catalyst for the open source election reform movement, and contributed open source language to the 2016 California Democratic Party Platform. Lawrence Rosen, a CAVO Advisory Board member, is the author of the Academic Free License and the Open Software License. Dr. Elizabeth Clarkson, a statistician at Wichita State University and a proponent of citizen-run exit polls and auditing voting systems for accuracy, is also on CAVO's Advisory Board.
