= QuickWin =

QuickWin was a library from Microsoft that made it possible to compile command line MS-DOS programs as Windows 3.1 applications, displaying their output in a window.

Since the release of Windows NT, Microsoft has included support for console applications in the Windows operating system itself via the Windows Console, eliminating the need for QuickWin. But Intel Visual Fortran still uses that library.

Borland's equivalent in Borland C++ 5 was called EasyWin.

There is a program called QuickWin on CodeProject, which does a similar thing.

== See also ==
- Command-line interface
