= GNU Readline =

Software library

- Original author: Brian Fox
- Developer: Chet Ramey
- Release: 1989; 37 years ago
- Stable release: 8.3 / 3 July 2025
- Preview release: 8.3-alpha / 22 April 2024
- Written in: C
- Type: Library
- License: 2009: GPL-3.0-or-later (Note: GPL-3.0-or-later since version 6.0 (2009-02-20).); 1997: GPL-2.0-or-later (Note: GPL-2.0-or-later from version 2.1 (1997-06-05) until version 5.2 (2006-10-11).); 1994: GPL-1.0-or-later (Note: GPL-1.0-or-later from ? until version 2.0 (1994-08-04).)
- Website: www.gnu.org/software/readline/
- Repository: git.savannah.gnu.org/cgit/readline.git

GNU Readline is a software library that provides in-line editing and history capabilities for interactive programs with a command-line interface, such as Bash. It is currently maintained by Chet Ramey as part of the GNU Project.

It allows users to move the text cursor, search the command history, control a kill ring (a more flexible version of a copy/paste clipboard) and use tab completion on a text terminal. As a cross-platform library, readline allows applications on various systems to exhibit identical line-editing behavior.

== History ==
Readline was created in 1988 by Free Software Foundation employee Brian Fox to implement line editing functionality required by POSIX for its shell. After the release of version 1.05, Fox passed control to Chet Ramey of Case Western who has been the sole maintainer since 1998.

== Editing modes ==
Readline supports both Emacs and vi editing modes, which determine how keyboard input is interpreted as editor commands. POSIX prescribes the vi editing mode while leaving other editing modes unspecified and in the discretion of implementations. Readline originally included its Emacs editing mode due to the influence of Korn Shell's Emacs editing mode. Emacs is the default mode.

=== Emacs keyboard shortcuts ===
Emacs editing mode key bindings are taken from the text editor Emacs.

On some systems, Esc must be used instead of Alt, because the Alt shortcut conflicts with another shortcut. For example, pressing Alt+f in Xfce's terminal emulator window does not move the cursor forward one word, but activates "File" in the menu of the terminal window, unless that is disabled in the emulator's settings.

- Tab ↹ : Autocompletes from the cursor position.
- Ctrl+a : Moves the cursor to the line start (equivalent to the key Home).
- Ctrl+b : Moves the cursor back one character (equivalent to the key ←).
- Ctrl+c : Sends the signal SIGINT via pseudoterminal to the current task, which aborts and closes it. (Note: A part of pseudoterminals or PTYs (for Linux), which is evident from the terminal configuration tools such as stty; in typical Linux distribution the PTY master endpoint treats special characters as signals to be sent to slaves e.g.SIGINT)
- Ctrl+d
  - Sends an EOF marker, which (unless disabled by an option) closes the current shell (equivalent to the command exit). (Only if there is no text on the current line)
  - If there is text on the current line, deletes the current character (then equivalent to the key Delete).
- Ctrl+e : (end) moves the cursor to the line end (equivalent to the key End).
- Ctrl+f : Moves the cursor forward one character (equivalent to the key →).
- Ctrl+g : Abort the reverse search and restore the original line.
- Ctrl+h : Deletes the previous character (same as backspace).
- Ctrl+i : Equivalent to the tab key.
- Ctrl+j : Equivalent to the enter key.
- Ctrl+k : Clears the line content after the cursor and copies it into the clipboard.
- Ctrl+l : Clears the screen content (equivalent to the command clear).
- Ctrl+n : (next) recalls the next command (equivalent to the key ↓).
- Ctrl+o : Executes the found command from history, and fetch the next line from the history for editing.
- Ctrl+p : (previous) recalls the prior command (equivalent to the key ↑).
- Ctrl+r : (reverse search) recalls the last command including the specified characters. A second Ctrl+r recalls the next anterior command that corresponds to the search.
- Ctrl+s : Go back to the next more recent command of the reverse search (beware to not execute it from a terminal because this command also launches its XOFF). If you changed that XOFF setting, use Ctrl+q to return.
- Ctrl+t : Transpose the previous two characters.
- Ctrl+u : Clears the line content before the cursor and copies it into the clipboard.
- Ctrl+v : If the next input is also a control sequence, type it literally (e. g. * Ctrl+v Ctrl+h types "^H", a literal backspace).
- Ctrl+w : Clears the word before the cursor and copies it into the clipboard.
- Ctrl+x Ctrl+e : Edits the current line in the $EDITOR program, or vi if undefined.
- Ctrl+x Ctrl+r : Read in the contents of the inputrc file, and incorporate any bindings or variable assignments found there.
- Ctrl+x Ctrl+u : Incremental undo, separately remembered for each line.
- Ctrl+x Ctrl+v : Display version information about the current instance of Bash.
- Ctrl+x Ctrl+x : Alternates the cursor with its old position. (C-x, because x has a crossing shape).
- Ctrl+y : (yank) adds the clipboard content from the cursor position.
- Ctrl+z : Sends the signal SIGTSTP to the current task, which suspends it. To execute it in background one can enter bg. To bring it back from background or suspension fg ['process name or job id'] (foreground) can be issued.
- Ctrl+_ : Incremental undo, separately remembered for each line.
- Alt+b : (backward) moves the cursor backward one word.
- Alt+c : Capitalizes the character under the cursor and moves to the end of the word.
- Alt+d : Cuts the word after the cursor.
- Alt+f : (forward) moves the cursor forward one word.
- Alt+l : Lowers the case of every character from the cursor's position to the end of the current word.
- Alt+r : Cancels the changes and puts back the line as it was in the history.
- Alt+u : Capitalizes every character from the cursor's position to the end of the current word.
- Alt+. : Insert the last argument to the previous command (the last word of the previous history entry).

== License ==
GNU Readline is notable for being a free software library which is licensed under the GNU General Public License (GPL). Free software libraries are far more often licensed under the GNU Lesser General Public License (LGPL), for example, the GNU C Library, GNU gettext and FLTK. A developer of an application who chooses to link to an LGPLv3 licensed library can use any license that does not: "restrict modification of the portions of the Library contained in the Combined Work and reverse engineering for debugging such modifications". But linking to a GPLv3 licensed library such as Readline requires the entire combined resulting application to be licensed under the GPLv3 when distributed, to comply with section 5 of the GPL.

This licensing was chosen by the FSF on the hopes that it would encourage software to switch to the GPL. An important example of an application changing its licensing to comply with the copyleft conditions of GNU Readline is CLISP, an implementation of Common Lisp. Originally released in 1987, it changed to the GPL license in 1992, after an email exchange between one of CLISP's original authors, Bruno Haible, and Richard Stallman, in which Stallman argued that the linking of readline in CLISP meant that Haible was required to re-license CLISP under the GPL if he wished to distribute the implementation of CLISP which used readline.

Another response has been to not use this in some projects, making text input use the primitive Unix terminal driver for editing.

=== Alternative libraries ===
Alternative libraries have been created with other licenses so they can be used by software projects which want to implement command line editing functionality, but be released with a non-GPL license.

- Many BSD systems have a BSD-licensed libedit. MariaDB and PHP allow for the user to select at build time whether to link with GNU Readline or with libedit.
- linenoise is a tiny C library that provides line editing functions. As of 2025, it is prominently used by MongoDB and Redis. It was integrated into Android in 2010, but has since been deprecated.
- Haskeline is a BSD-3-Clause licensed readline-like library for Haskell. It is mainly written for the Glasgow Haskell Compiler, but is available to other Haskell projects which need line-editing services as well.
- PSReadLine is a BSD-2-Clause licensed readline implementation written in C# for PowerShell inspired by bash and GNU Readline

== Sample code ==
The following code is in C and must be linked against the readline library by passing a -lreadline flag to the compiler:

#include <stdlib.h>
#include <stdio.h>
#include <readline/readline.h>
#include <readline/history.h>

int main()
{
    // Configure readline to auto-complete paths when the tab key is hit.
    rl_bind_key('\t', rl_complete);

    // Enable history
    using_history();

    while (1) {
        // Display prompt and read input
        char* input = readline("prompt> ");

        // Check for EOF.
        if (!input)
            break;

        // Add input to readline history.
        add_history(input);

        // Do stuff...

        // Free buffer that was allocated by readline
        free(input);
    }
    return 0;
}

== Bindings ==
Non-C programming languages that provide language bindings for readline include

- Python's built-in readline module;
- Ruby's built-in readline module;
- Perl's third-party (CPAN) Term::ReadLine module, specifically Term::ReadLine::Gnu for GNU ReadLine.
- PHP's extension.

Support for readline alternatives differ among these bindings.
