= Google Shell =

Open-source browser based Unix-like shell

- Website type: Search engine
- Available in: Multilingual
- Creator: Stefan Grothkopp
- Website: www.goosh.org
- Commercial: no
- Registration: optional
- Launched: 2008
- Current status: active

Google Shell, or goosh, is an open-source browser based Unix-like shell used as a front end for Google Search. Written in AJAX the results are shown directly on the page. Google Shell is open source under the Artistic License/GPL. The code is currently hosted on Google Code.

== Commands ==
Users are able to use most of the features of Google through specific commands and keywords. Functions that are marked with a * are currently experimental, and should be used with caution. While most of the command results are displayed as text, a few will display a portion of a website for you to interact with.

Command	Aliases	Parameters	Function
web	search,s,w	keywords	google web search
news	n	keywords	google news search
more	m		get more results
blogs	blog,b	keywords	google blog search
read	rss,r	url	read feed of url
feeds	feed,f	keywords	google feed search
place	places,map,p	address	google maps search
images	image,i	keywords	google image search
video	videos,v	keywords	google video search
clear	c		clear the screen
wiki	Wikipedia	keywords	Wikipedia search
help	man,h,?	command	displays help text
cd		command	change mode
site	in	url keywords	search in a specific website
open	o	url	open url in new window
go	g	url	open url
lucky	l	keywords	go directly to first result
ls		command	lists commands
addengine			add goosh to firefox search box
load		url	load an extension
calculate	calc	expression	evaluate a mathematical expression
settings	set	name value	edit settings
gmail	mail	compose	read & write mail in gmail *
login			login with your google account *
logout			log out of goosh *

== Customization ==
The default amount of results when searching is only 4, but this, along with other settings, can be changed. When a user is logged into their Google Account, their settings are saved remotely.
