= Dialog (software) =

Dialog widget software

dialog
- Dialog - editbox widget
- Original author: Savio Lam
- Developer: Thomas Dickey
- Initial release: 1994
- Stable release: 1.3-20240307 / 10 March 2024; 21 months ago
- Repository: invisible-mirror.net/archives/dialog/
- Operating system: Unix, Linux, POSIX
- Type: Shell scripts
- License: LGPL
- Website: invisible-island.net/dialog/

Dialog is an application used in shell scripts which displays text user interface widgets. It uses the curses or ncurses library. The latter provides users with the ability to use a mouse, e.g., in an xterm.

Dialog was created by Savio Lam (first reported version 0.3 was in 1994). It was further modified by several people. Since 1999 it has been maintained (and rewritten) by Thomas Dickey.

At least one fork exists, a FreeBSD-only split into application and library in late 1994. One might also consider lxdialog (part of menuconfig), except that it has been reduced to fragments that can no longer run dialog scripts.

There are several programs inspired by dialog; not all read the same scripts. The most well-known are Xdialog and whiptail.

== See also ==
- CDK (programming library)
- Zenity
