= CDK (programming library) =

Software library of widgets for text user interfaces

- Original author(s): Mike Glover
- Developer(s): Thomas Dickey
- Stable release: 5.0-20200228 / February 28, 2020; 5 years ago
- Repository: invisible-mirror.net/archives/cdk/
- Operating system: Unix, Linux, POSIX
- Type: Programming library
- License: BSD
- Website: invisible-island.net/cdk/

CDK is a library written in C that provides a collection of widgets for text user interfaces (TUI) development. The widgets wrap ncurses functionality to make writing full screen curses programs faster. Perl and Python bindings are also available.

There are two versions of the library. It was originally written by Mike Glover, introduced as version 4.6 in comp.sources.unix. The other version was extended beginning in May 1999 by Thomas Dickey.

== Programs that use CDK ==
- Password Management System A console based password management program

== See also ==
- Dialog (software)
