= GPM (software) =

- Original author(s): Alessandro Rubini
- Developer(s): Nico Schottelius
- Stable release: 1.20.7 / October 26, 2012
- Preview release: 1.99.7 / July 24, 2008
- Repository: github.com/telmich/gpm
- Written in: C
- Operating system: Linux
- Type: Mouse
- License: GNU General Public License
- Website: www.nico.schottelius.org/software/gpm/

GPM ("General Purpose Mouse") software provides support for mouse devices in Linux virtual consoles. It is included in most Linux distributions.

ncurses supports GPM; many applications use ncurses mouse-support. Other applications that work with GPM include Midnight Commander, Emacs, and JED.

== See also ==
- moused, a mouse-driver for FreeBSD

== Sources ==
- Linux in a Nutshell (5th ed.). O'Reilly Media. 27 July 2005. ISBN 0-596-00930-5.
