= Peter T. Kirstein =

British computer scientist and Internet pioneer (1933–2020)

Peter Kirstein CBE FREng DFBCS FIET FInstP
- Born: Peter Thomas Kirschstein; 20 June 1933; Berlin, Germany
- Died: 8 January 2020 (aged 86); London, England
- Education: Highgate School
- Alma mater: University of Cambridge (BA); Stanford University (MS, PhD)
- Awards: Marconi Prize (2015); SIGCOMM Award (1999); Jonathan B. Postel Service Award (2003)
- Scientific career
- Workplaces: CERN; General Electric; University College London
- Thesis: Curvilinear space-charge flow with applications to electron guns (1957)
- Doctoral advisor: Gordon S. Kino; Marvin Chodorow
- Doctoral students: Jon Crowcroft
- Website: www.cs.ucl.ac.uk/staff/P.Kirstein/

Peter Thomas Kirstein (né Kirschstein; 20 June 1933 – 8 January 2020) was a British computer scientist who played a role in the creation of the Internet. He made the first internetworking connection on the ARPANET in 1973, by providing a link to British academic networks, and was instrumental in defining and implementing TCP/IP alongside Vint Cerf and Bob Kahn.

Kirstein is often recognized as the "father of the European Internet".

== Education and early life ==
Kirstein was born on 20 June 1933 in Berlin, Germany, the son of Eleanor (Jacobsohn) and Walter Kirschstein. His parents were dentists, and his father was awarded the Iron Cross during WWI. His family was Jewish and his mother had British citizenship from being born in London, so, fearing for their safety in Nazi governed-Germany the family immigrated to the UK in 1937.

He was educated at Highgate School in North London, received a Bachelor of Arts degree from University of Cambridge in 1954, an MSc and PhD in electrical engineering from Stanford University (in 1955 and 1957, respectively) and a Doctor of Science (DSc) in engineering from the University of London in 1970.

== Career and research ==
He was a member of the staff at CERN from 1959 to 1963. He did research for General Electric at Zurich from 1963 to 1967. He knew Vint Cerf since 1967.

Kirstein was a professor at the University of London Institute of Computer Science (ICS) from 1970 to 1973. After that, he joined the faculty at the University College London in 1973, serving as the first head of the computer science department from 1980 to 1994. He supervised Jon Crowcroft. Kirstein set up Queen Elizabeth's first official email message in 1976.

=== Internet development ===
Building on the work of Donald Davies at the National Physical Laboratory in the 1960s, in 1973 Kirstein's research group at University College London became one of only the two international connections on the ARPANET, alongside Norway (NORSAR and NDRE). UCL thereafter provided a gateway between the ARPANET and British academic networks which was the first internetwork for resource sharing.

Research led by Bob Kahn at DARPA and Vint Cerf at Stanford University and later DARPA resulted in the formulation of the Transmission Control Program (TCP), with its RFC 675 specification written by Cerf with Yogen Dalal and Carl Sunshine in December 1974. The following year, testing began through concurrent implementations at Stanford, University College London and BBN. The ARPANET connection to UCL later grew into the trans-Atlantic SATNET. A two-way, followed by a three-way internetworking experiment linking UCL, via SATNET, with nodes in the ARPANET, and with a mobile vehicle in PRNET took place in 1977.

Kirstein and his team members participated from the outset of the Internet Experiment Note meetings, beginning in March 1977. (Note: See also the Final Report of the Stanford University TCP project, IEN 151. IETF., written by Cerf in 1980. This was originally, in TCP version 2 in 1977 (IEN5), to be entitled "Final Report of the Internetwork TCP Project" and to be written by Cerf [Stanford], Stephen Edge [UCL], Andrew Hinchley [UCL], Richard Karp [Stanford], Peter T. Kirstein [UCL], and Paal Spilling [NDRE]. This title was carried over into version 3 (IEN21) and into the list of references in version 4 but the present title was adopted in the preface (IEN55).) His research group at UCL played a significant role in the very earliest experimental work on what became the TCP/IP. In 1978, Kirstein co-authored with Vint Cerf one of the most significant early technical papers on the internetworking concept. He chaired the International Cooperation Board (ICB), formed by Cerf in 1979, to coordinate activities to develop packet satellite research. UCL adopted TCP/IP in November 1982, ahead of the ARPANET, becoming one of the first nodes on the Internet.

In early 1983, Kirstein chaired the International Collaboration Board, which involved six NATO countries, served on the Networking Panel of the NATO Science Committee (serving as chair in 2001), and served on Advisory Committees for the Australian Research Council, the Canadian Department of Communications, the German GMD, and the Indian Education and Research Network (ERNET) Project. He led the Silk Project, which provides satellite-based Internet access to the Newly Independent States in the Southern Caucasus and Central Asia.

=== Awards and honours ===
Kirstein was appointed Commander of the Order of the British Empire (CBE) for his work on the Internet. He was also a Fellow of the Royal Academy of Engineering (FREng), a Fellow of the Institute of Electrical and Electronics Engineers, an Honorary Foreign Member of the American Academy of Arts and Sciences, and a Distinguished Fellow of the British Computer Society. He received the SIGCOMM Award in 1999 for "contributions to the practical understanding of large-scale networks through the deployment of international testbeds", and the Postel Award in 2003, as well as various other awards for his contributions to the development of the Internet internationally. He was also elected a member of the National Academy of Engineering in 2009 for contributions to computer networking and for leadership in bringing the Internet to Europe.

In 2012 Kirstein was inducted into the Internet Hall of Fame by the Internet Society. In 2015 he was awarded the prestigious Marconi Prize.

== Personal life ==
Kirstein died from a brain tumour on the morning of 8 January 2020 while in his home. Shortly after his death, Steve Hailes, Head of Department for UCL Computer Science, wrote about him:

"Peter was very widely recognised as a pioneer of the Internet and has many honours to his name [...] Much of this was undoubtedly down to an incredibly logical mind, coupled with a level of interest, vision and determination that saw him retire only late last year at the age of 86. [...] Peter was also deeply empathetic and sensitive: he was both gentleman and a gentle man, he was a source of encouragement and sage advice, he was persuasive, open-minded, fair and never afraid to learn something new or to admit that he didn't know."

== See also ==
- Adrian V. Stokes, a computer scientist who worked for Kirstein in his early ARPANET research
- Cambridge Ring (computer network)
- Donald Davies, proposed, in 1965, a commercial national data network in the UK based on packet switching
- Internet in the United Kingdom § History
- Internet pioneers
- Louis Pouzin, developed the CYCLADES network in France, concepts from which were incorporated into the design of the Internet Protocol Suite
- Royal Signals and Radar Establishment
- Sylvia Wilbur, a computer scientist who worked for Kirstein in his early ARPANET research
- University of London Computer Centre

== Sources ==
- Moschovitis, Christos J. P. (1999). History of the Internet: A Chronology, 1843 to the Present. ABC-CLIO. ISBN 978-1-57607-118-2.
