= Richard L. Peterson =

American behavioral economist and psychiatrist

Richard L. Peterson is an American behavioral economist and psychiatrist. He has developed behavioral finance-based quantitative models, imaged the brains of subjects play-trading, and is a frequent writer about social media sentiment. Peterson developed text mining software to identify and quantify economically predictive sentiments, and speaks widely in the areas of behavioral finance and social media analytics.

== Life ==
Peterson graduated from the University of Texas, with a BS cum laude in Electrical Engineering, a BA, and Doctor of Medicine degrees (M.D.). He performed postdoctoral neuroeconomics research at Stanford University, and is Board-certified in Psychiatry.

He founded and runs the sentiment analysis firm MarketPsych Data and ran the psychology-based quantitative asset management firm MarketPsy Capital. In the educational field he developed financial personality tests, published in academic journals and textbooks, and is an associate editor of the Journal of Behavioral Finance. In 2007, Peterson wrote the book Inside the Investor's Brain (Wiley), which translated behavioral finance concepts from academia to a lay audience. The book aggregated and reviewed research indicating that innate neurological influences predictably bias individual investor behavior. In 2016 he published Trading on Sentiment (Wiley), which explained quantitative research on media themes and sentiments that appear to drive asset prices in predictable patterns.

He lives in California with his family.

== Media ==
Peterson has appeared in CBS Evening News, CNBC, NPR, BBC, Wall Street Journal, Financial Times, and Harvard Business Review, and he was called "Wall Street's Top Psychiatrist" by the Associated Press.

== Academic journal articles ==
- Peterson R. (2007). "Affect and Financial Decision Making: How neuroscience can inform market participants." Journal of Behavioral Finance, v8, n2.
- Peterson R. (2005). "Investing Lessons from Neuroscience: fMRI of the reward system." Brain Research Bulletin. v67, n5, 391-397.
- Knutson B, Taylor J, Kaufman M, Peterson R, Glover G. (2005). "Distributed Neural Representation of Expected Value." Journal of Neuroscience, 25, 4806-4812.
- Knutson B & Peterson, R. (2005). "Neurally reconstructing expected utility." Games and Economic Behavior. 52, 305-315.
- Peterson, R. (2002). "'Buy on the Rumor:' Anticipatory affect and investor behavior." Journal of Psychology and Financial Markets, v3, n4.

== Textbook chapters ==
- Teodoro, T. Q., Clark-Bell, J., & Peterson, R. L. (2023). "ESG Controversies and Stock Returns." In Handbook of Alternative Data in Finance, Volume I (pp. 350-366). Chapman and Hall/CRC.
- Teodoro, T. Q., Clark-Bell, J., & Peterson, R. L. (2023). "Defining Market States with Media Sentiment." In Handbook of Alternative Data in Finance, Volume I (pp. 267-278). Chapman and Hall/CRC.
- Luciani, A., Liu, C., & Peterson, R. (2022). Media Sentiment Momentum. In Handbook of Alternative Data in Finance, Volume I (pp. 247-266). Chapman and Hall/CRC.
- Peterson, R. (2016). "The Psychology of Markets: Information processing and the impact on asset prices." Handbook of Sentiment Analysis in Finance. pp 263-285. Eds. Gautam Mitra and Xiang Yu. Albury Books.
- Liu, C., & Peterson, R. (2016). "Currency Sentiment Analysis." Handbook of Sentiment Analysis in Finance. pp 422-431. Eds. Gautam Mitra and Xiang Yu. Albury Books.
- Fafula, A., & Peterson, R. (2016). "Predicting Global Economic Activity with Media Analytics." Handbook of Sentiment Analysis in Finance. pp 366-381. Eds. Gautam Mitra and Xiang Yu. Albury Books.
- Peterson R. (2014). "Neurofinance." Chapter 23 of Behavioral Finance. Eds. Baker and Ricciardi. John Wiley & Sons: New York.
- Peterson R. (2010). "Neuroeconomics and Neurofinance." Chapter 5 of Behavioral Finance: Investors, Corporations, and Markets. Eds. Baker and Nofsinger. John Wiley & Sons: New York.
- Peterson, R. (2006). "Buy on the Rumor" and "Sell on the news." In M. K. Ong (Ed.), Risk management (pp. 677-698). Academic Press.

== Books ==
- Trading on Sentiment: The Power of Minds over Markets. Wiley, John & Sons: New York, March 2016, ISBN 978-1119122760
- MarketPsych: How to Manage Fear and Build Your Investor Identity, Wiley, John & Sons, September 2010, ISBN 978-0-470-54358-0
- Inside the Investor's Brain: The Power of Mind over Money, Wiley, John & Sons, July 2007, ISBN 978-0-470-06737-6
