= Adrian V. Stokes =

British computer scientist (1945–2020)

Adrian V Stokes (25 June 1945 – 7 April 2020) was a British computer scientist who was an Internet pioneer and worked on the first implementation of email in the United Kingdom in the 1970s.

== Education ==
Stokes earned a BSc in Chemistry and a PhD in Theoretical Chemistry at University College London (UCL) and he then went on to specialise in computer science.

== Career ==
In 1973, whilst a research assistant at UCL's Institute of Computer Science, Stokes was involved with a research team led by Peter Kirstein who were working on ARPANET, the experimental computer network of the United States Department of Defense. ARPANET became the Internet in the mid-1970s, and one of Stokes' responsibilities was the first implementation of email in the United Kingdom, as well as early monitoring software for the interconnection of the ARPANET with British academic networks, the first international heterogenous computer network.

He contributed to a number of books on communication protocols and computer networking from the late 1970s to the early 1990s.

== Personal life ==
Stokes had spina bifida, and campaigned on behalf of people with disabilities for decades. He was the president of Disabled Motoring UK.

== Awards and honours ==
Stokes was made an Officer of the Order of the British Empire (OBE) for services to disabled people in 1983.

He was included on a Stanford University "Birth of the Internet" plaque, recognising him as an Internet pioneer.

== See also ==
- Sylvia Wilbur
