= Crown Representative for Small Businesses =

United Kingdom Crown Representative for Small Businesses
- Royal Arms of His Majesty's Government
- Incumbent; Shirley Cooper since 19 February 2024
- Cabinet Office of the United Kingdom
- Appointer: His Majesty The King (on the advice of the Prime Minister)
- Term length: At His Majesty's Pleasure
- Formation: 2011
- First holder: Stephen Allott

The Crown Representative for Small Businesses in the Government of the United Kingdom is an appointed position with responsibility in the field of procurement for the relationship between the UK Government and small and medium-sized enterprises (SMEs).

The position was established in 2011 and is currently held by Shirley Cooper.

== Responsibilities ==
The UK Government describes the Crown Representative as being responsible within the procurement field for leading on "the overall relationship between the government and small businesses, making sure the government gets best value from SMEs, and that they in turn have the best possible opportunity to work with the government."

== History ==
Following the formation of the Cameron-Clegg Coalition Government, the Department for Business, Innovation and Skills launched a report, Backing Small Business, which committed to an aspiration of 25% of government procurement spending being made with SMEs by 2015. Upon publication in 2010, this figure stood at 6.8% of government procurement spending. To support the delivery of this target, in 2011 the Cabinet Office announced the establishment of the position of Crown Representative for SMEs.

The first Crown Representative, former president of Micromuse and founder of the Cambridge Computer Lab Ring Stephen Allott, launched the Innovation Launch Pad in 2011 to seek out new suppliers for government. Allott promoted the creation and adoption of the UK Government G-Cloud, a framework targeted at easing procurement of information technology cloud services. By 2013, of the 700 registered suppliers, 80% were SMEs. During Allott's tenure as Crown Representative, the SME share of central government procurement spend rose to 27%, including direct and indirect spend.

In 2016, co-founder of StartUp Britain Emma Jones was appointed the new Crown Representative following Allott's move to leading G-Cloud business development in 2015. During Jones' tenure, the position title changed from Crown Representative for SMEs to Crown Representative for Small Businesses.

In 2019, Jones was succeeded by Martin Traynor OBE, a business executive who was chair of the King Richard III Visitor Centre and former president of Leicestershire Chamber of Commerce. Traynor held a central role in the development of the Procurement Act 2023, an act of the Parliament of the United Kingdom designed to overhaul public procurement law in the United Kingdom.

By 2023, SME share of central government procurement spend had fallen to 20%.

The current Crown Representative since 2024, former chair and president of the Chartered Institute of Procurement and Supply, Shirley Cooper OBE, is involved in the implementation of the Procurement Act 2023.

== List of Crown Representatives for Small Businesses ==
Originally titled Crown Representative for SMEs, there have been four office holders since the position was established in 2011.

Crown Representative	Term of office		Reporting to	Prime Minister	Ministry
Stephen Allott	2011	2015	Permanent Secretary to the Cabinet Office	David Cameron	Cameron-Cleg I Cameron II
Emma Jones	2016	2019	Permanent Secretary to the Cabinet Office	Theresa May	May I May II
Martin Traynor	2019	2024	Permanent Secretary to the Cabinet Office	Boris Johnson Liz Truss Rishi Sunak	Johnson I Johnson II Truss Sunak
Shirley Cooper	2024	Incumbent	Permanent Secretary to the Cabinet Office	Rishi Sunak Keir Starmer	Sunak Starmer
