= Chinwag =

DMY Chinwag is an Internet community based in Soho, London, United Kingdom, consisting of new media and digital marketing professionals.

Chinwag was founded in 1996, by Sam Michel, and hosts several of the UK's oldest known electronic mailing lists, including uk-netmarketing. These email lists form the center of the community and include contributions from many notable Internet pioneers and commentators including Bill Thompson, Ivan Pope and Brent Hoberman.

A sister site, Chinwag Jobs, was launched based on Chinwag's uknm-jobs e-mail list, an email-based announcement service for jobs within the Internet and digital media industries. Chinwag Jobs is a recruitment website, about which discussions have appeared in New Media Age.

Chinwag also hosts monthly events under the brand Chinwag Live. These events are informal, panel-based sessions focusing on issues affecting the new media industry. Past speakers include Andrew Orlowski of The Register and Neville Hobson. Chinwag is also known for its periodic, large-scale networking evenings.

The company also a series of trade missions for UK Trade & Investment, specifically design for companies operating in the digital sector. Digital Missions to date are:

- Digital Mission to Washington, 11–15 July 2011
- Digital Mission to New York, 1–5 November 2010
- Digital Mission to SXSW interactive, 11–17 March 2010
- Digital Mission to New York, 14–19 September 2009
- Digital Mission to SXSW interactive, 13–17 March 2009
