= Carrenza =

UK cloud-computing company

- Industry: Cloud computing
- Founded: Formed in 2001
- Headquarters: London, UK
- Key people: Dan Sutherland (CEO), Matthew McGrory (Managing Director), Thomas Konopka (Sales Director), Kevin Cooper (Technical Director),
- Products: cloud computing, infrastructure as a service, platform as a service, public cloud, private cloud, hybrid cloud, systems integration, enterprise application integration.
- Website: https://carrenza.com

Carrenza was a cloud-computing company based in London, United Kingdom. The company was acquired by Six Degrees Technology Group in 2016.

== Operations ==
Carrenza was a UK-based IT company that provides Cloud computing technologies. It offered a range of public cloud, private cloud and hybrid cloud services, including Infrastructure as a Service (IaaS), Platform as a Service (PaaS), enterprise application integration and system integration. Carrenza partnered with several enterprise IT providers and was an accredited VMware Enterprise Service Partner and HP (Hewlett-Packard) Cloud Agile Partner.

The company was based on Commercial Street, in the heart of the East London Tech City district, which is host to a large number of technology companies.

== History ==
Carrenza was formed in 2001 as a consultancy by chief executive and founder Dan Sutherland. It began trading in 2004 and launched its first enterprise cloud computing platform in 2006, becoming one of the first companies in Europe to provide this type of hosting service.

In 2009, it formed a partnership with Comic Relief and its affiliated campaigns Red Nose Day Sport Relief to provide IT infrastructure services to the charity, an arrangement that has won industry recognition.

In 2013 it launched its first overseas services, with a mainland Europe cloud node based in Amsterdam.

== Partnerships and customers ==
Carrenza had formed partnerships with a range of IT providers. It was one of the first companies in Europe to become a HP Cloud Agile partner., using HP blade servers and HP 3PAR SAN technology to power its cloud computing services. The company's products also use VMware vCloud IaaS tools and it is taking part in the VMware lighthouse initiative helping develop the next generation of VMware products and services.

Other technology companies that Carrenza has worked closely with include Cisco, for enterprise security and loadblancing services, and Oracle. The company was the first to deploy Oracle Database 11g stretched RAC in production.

It has also won two Oracle partner awards, including a Special Recognition award for its work with Comic Relief. The company has also been recognised by the UK IT Industry, receiving awards in 2009 for Community Project of the Year and in 2010 for best small business project for its Monopoly City Streets Work.

Other companies that have partnered with Carrenza for their cloud-based IT services include Age UK, Haymarket Media Group, the World Wide Fund for Nature, Royal Bank of Scotland, eBay and Cineworld.

== Accreditations ==
Carrenza's services are accredited for their compliance with several key international IT security and quality standards. These include:

- ISO27001:2005, Information Security Management System for all Carrenza services.
- UK Government G-Cloud, Carrenza has been awarded a place on the UK government's G-Cloud iii framework as an Infrastructure as a Service provider.

== See also ==
- Cloud computing
- Infrastructure as a service
- Platform as a service
- Public cloud
- Hybrid cloud
- Systems integration
- Enterprise application integration
