= UKCloud =

British cloud computing provider

- Type: Private
- Industry: Cloud Computing
- Founded: 2011
- Founders: Jeff Thomas; Jeremy Sanders; Phil Dawson; Simon Hansford
- Defunct: October 25, 2022
- Fate: Insolvency
- Headquarters: Farnborough
- Area served: United Kingdom
- Brands: UKCloud UKCloud Health UKCloudX
- Number of employees: 250+
- Website: ukcloud.com

UKCloud, also trading as UKCloud Health and UKCloudX, was a British cloud provider, headquartered in Farnborough, United Kingdom. It provided multicloud services to organisations in the UK public sector and other regulated industries. The company was founded in 2011 as Skyscape Cloud Services, rebranding as UKCloud in August 2016. UKCloud, along with its UKCloud Health and UKCloudX divisions, supported the digital workload for organisations such as Genomics England, Ministry of Justice, Capgemini and London Business School.

On 21 January 2022, it was announced that UKCloud had been acquired by Hadston 2 Limited - a newly created special purpose investment company led by UKCloud's Chairman, Jeff Thomas and backed by institutional investors, including Digital Alpha Advisors and BGF.

On 25 October 2022, UKCloud went into liquidation.

== History ==
The company was established in 2011 by co-founders Jeff Thomas, Jeremy Sanders, Phil Dawson and Simon Hansford as Skyscape Cloud Services, but changed the name to UKCloud Ltd five years later following a legal wrangle with Sky.

In 2017, UKCloud Health was launched to support health technology across the UK health and care sector. The UKCloud Health platform is used by health technology providers such as Babylon Health, IMMJ Systems and Capgemini. In 2021, UKCloud Health launched Health Cloud.

UKCloudX was announced in 2018 to focus on providing cloud services to the UK Defence and National Security sector. UKCloudX claimed to offer the first public cloud for high classification systems in the UK.

In 2019, Cisco-backed Digital Alpha Advisors announced an investment in UKCloud intended to increase the growth of the company.

The company focused on changing how the UK government purchases and uses IT services, detailed in the March 2011 UK Government ICT Strategy. The company has since sold to government through the G-Cloud frameworks Digital Marketplace and has been doing so since the first iteration of the framework in 2012. They offer a platform consisting of VMWare, Oracle, Openstack, and Microsoft Azure

UKCloud was a carbon neutral company who offered its customers carbon neutral hosting, which is achieved through an independent assessment of the CO_{2} emissions produced from direct and indirect sources required to deliver, followed by an offset-inclusive emissions reduction programme.

All applications and data were hosted in UK datacentres and the company was incorporated as a British company under UK legal jurisdiction.

== Administration ==
On 25 October 2022, the Insolvency Service announced that the courts had issued winding-up orders against UKCloud and its parent company, and that they had entered in to liquidation. The Official Receiver will wind down the companies' activities and investigate the cause of their insolvency.

The UK government underwrote the activities of the official receiver, which as of early 2024 cost it £17.5 million. The administration is expected to finish in the second half of 2024.

== Awards ==
In 2016, UKCloud won the Communications Deloitte Technology Fast 500 EMEA Award. It has also won the Cloudex 20:20 Award and a UK IT Industry Award in 2013. and are winners of The Sunday Times Hiscox Tech Track 100 2016.

UKCloud were winners for the Tech Track 100, ranking number 1 in the league table in 2016.

In 2017, UKCloud were announced as recipients of the Queen’s Awards for Enterprise in Innovation.

In 2018, UKCloud won the award for G-Cloud Public Sector Provider of the year for the second year consecutively, the company also featured as one of the Future Fifty’s fastest growing technology companies.

In 2019, UKCloud announced it had been recognised by the Best Companies scheme with a one-star accreditation. UKCloud also won the Service Excellence award at Inspire'19.

== Partnerships ==
The original public cloud platform was delivered in partnership with QinetiQ, VMware, Cisco, Dell EMC and Ark Data Centres.

UKCloud later moved to a multicloud platform, offering cloud environments from a choice of technology partners including Microsoft (Azure), Red Hat (Openstack & OpenShift), Oracle and VMware.

UKCloud partnered with Ark Data Centres to host its public cloud platforms within the UK government's Crown Campus, which is also used by Crown Hosting Data Centres.
