= EMMAN =

UK higher education network company

- Type: Limited
- Industry: Internet
- Founded: 1994 by the University of Nottingham and Nottingham Trent University
- Headquarters: East Midlands, England, UK
- Area served: Nottinghamshire, Leicestershire, Derbyshire, Lincolnshire, Rutland, and Northamptonshire
- Key people: University of Nottingham; Nottingham Trent University Loughborough University; University of Leicester; De Montfort University University of Derby; University of Northampton; University of Lincoln
- Services: High bandwidth Metropolitan Area Network for the Higher Education Institutions, Further Education Institutions, Specialist Colleges and other institutions across the East Midlands region
- Website: www.emman.net

EMMAN (East Midlands Metropolitan Area Network Limited) was a company limited by guarantee and jointly owned by its members, eight Higher Education Institutions in the East Midlands region of the United Kingdom. It provided a high-bandwidth metropolitan area network for educational institutions in the region. The company was dissolved in March 2015.

== Function ==
EMMAN Ltd. dissolved on 10 March 2015.

EMMAN owns and runs a high bandwidth Regional Network whose primary purpose is to deliver connectivity to the Janet network and the Internet for the higher education institutions, further education institutions, specialist colleges and other institutions across the East Midlands region. The network is managed by EMMAN Ltd under a contract with Janet who operate the Janet network.

EMMAN also provides Internet connectivity separate from Janet and wishes to develop communications within the region to encompass a broader range of customers including libraries, schools, local authorities, small business enterprises and lifelong learning organisations.

== History ==
=== 1994 ===
The East Midlands Metropolitan Area Network (EMMAN) was established in 1994, initially as a point to point link between The University of Nottingham (UoN) and The Nottingham Trent University (NTU) in order to connect NTU to the Janet network via the SMDS connection at UoN. The link consisted of a dark fibre connection, supplied by the local cable TV franchise, Diamond Cable. The connection consisted of an FDDI ring with two extra dark fibres for development work.

=== 1996 ===
The University of Derby (UoD) was added to EMMAN using an 8 Mbit/s Mercury connection to UoN. During 1996 and early 1997 six Janet secondary connections have been made directly to the MAN at NTU.

=== 1997 ===
The UoN to NTU link was upgraded to 155 Mbit/s ATM together with an ATM connection from NTU to UoN Adult Education Centre.

=== 1998 ===
1998 saw the extension of the MAN to the NTU Clifton site, an alternative route in the Nottingham area and the ordering of a dark fibre link to Derby (installed in January 2000) with a consequent upgrade to ATM at 155 Mbit/s. In addition, EMMAN was directly connected to a 34 Mbit/s ATM link from SuperJanet III at UoN.

=== 1999 ===
The addition of dark fibres from Nottingham to Loughborough, from Loughborough to Leicester, and the provision of ATM switches at Loughborough University and De Montfort University.

=== 2000 ===
The University of Leicester, University College Northampton and the University of Lincolnshire & Humberside to be connected. An additional 155 Mbit/s link from Nottingham to London, which would provide an upgrade for both EMMAN and the West Midlands MAN, MidMAN was made live in March 2000.

The EMMAN logo was designed by Matthew Stimson, who was studying Business & Technology at Nottingham Trent University between the years 1999 and 2001.

=== 2001 ===
On 16 January 2001, the link from EMMAN was switched from SuperJanet III to SuperJanet 4. MidMAN followed on 13 March and the 155 Mbit/s links from Nottingham to London and from Nottingham to Warwick became redundant. Once the SuperJanet 4 connection at Nottingham was operational, both the universities in the City of Nottingham moved from ATM to connecting their LANs to EMMAN with Fast Ethernet. In both cases, some FE colleges connected through the universities' sites continued to use ATM. In April 2001, University College Northampton was connected to EMMAN via DMU. In the same month, the University of Leicester was also connected with a Gigabit Ethernet links to the University of Nottingham and the nearby De Montfort University, for resilience. During the latter part of 2001, the number of FE colleges connected to EMMAN rose to over thirty as UKERNA implemented the national extension of Janet to FE sites. The East Midlands Regional Support Centre was set up to assist the colleges with the implementation and running of their connections to SuperJanet.

=== 2002 ===
The University of Lincoln (previously the University of Lincolnshire and Humberside) was connected via Nottingham Trent University, bringing the total of HE institutions to eight. These eight institutions entered into negotiation for making the MAN a legal entity and the current company called EMMAN Ltd was formed in March 2002. Most of the links were upgraded from ATM to Gigabit Ethernet. Two additional 8 Mbit/s serial links were also procured which connected the University of Derby to Lincoln and UCN to the University of Leicester, giving Derby and UCN resilient routes to the rest of the MAN and hence to SuperJanet.

=== 2006 ===
During 2006 the backbone was completely overhauled in readiness for the upgrade from SuperJanet 4 to SuperJanet 5. An optical network layer was introduced directly over the fibre links between node sites to provide massive scalability in bandwidth across the backbone. This network utilises Dense Wavelength Division Multiplexing (DWDM) with 10 Gbit/s per wavelength. The equipment also has the ability to structure each wavelength into separate multiple 1 Gbit/s channels for the routers that run the production IP network as well as having the capability to provide dedicated point to point links at speeds up to 10 Gbit/s either within EMMAN or for linking to the outside world via the Janet Lightpath service. Two new core nodes were created at the Nottingham Trent University secondary datacentre and the University of Nottingham primary datacentre and the EMMAN topology re-engineered into a dual star format. Each core node has a separate connection into the Janet network and each edge node has dual connections into the core to provide a fully resilient service.

=== 2007 ===
A direct commercial link to the Internet was commissioned to provide Internet access for EMMAN connected customers’ activities that are not eligible for use over the Janet network. Additional public sector organisations connected to Janet via EMMAN.

=== 2008 ===
All of the FE college uplinks into EMMAN were upgraded to 100 Mbit/s.

=== 2009 ===
EMMAN Shared Information Security Services (ESISS) launched in conjunction with HEFCE to provide effective and efficient specialist information security services to UK HE and related sectors.

=== 2012 ===
August - All distribution nodes based at University sites changed to comprise two geographically separate linked nodes, each with a diverse fibre feed. All backbone feeds now via 10 Gbit/s Ethernet IP services running over OTU2 / OTU2e / OTU1e lightpaths.

=== 2013 ===
February - All University connections now running at 2 x 10 Gbit/s. October - Commercial traffic no longer carried.

=== 2014 ===
April - The regional network and all operational tasks transferred to JANET (UK), the national academic network provider.

=== 2015 ===
March - EMMAN Ltd. is formally dissolved by Companies House on 10 March 2015.

== EMMAN Network Design 2009 ==
The EMMAN network is built around 8 edge nodes housed at the member sites and two core nodes housed at separate locations at the member sites in Nottingham. Each edge node contains one or more routers to which the institutions in the locality are connected via wide area communications links.

The nodes are interlinked by a ring of dedicated fibre optic links. An optical network layer utilising DWDM (Dense Wavelength Division Multiplexing) operates over these fibres and provides multiple high speed channels for services at the layer above. The production IP backbone operates in a fully resilient dual star configuration around the core nodes with channels defined to ensure uncontended backhaul from each edge node to both core nodes.

The links connecting institutions to EMMAN are mostly rented from commercial carriers and all but a handful operate at 100 Mbit/s

The production IP network has dual resilient connections into the Janet high speed academic network at each of the core nodes in Nottingham.

A separate commercial IP network is provided over the backbone to provide direct Internet connectivity for those customers not eligible to use the Janet network.

The optical network layer can be easily expanded to provide dedicated channels for other services at bandwidths ranging from 1 Gbit/s to 10 Gbit/s for ad hoc point to point connectivity either from one EMMAN node to another or to the outside world via the Janet Lightpath service.

== ESISS ==
In September 2009 the EMMAN Shared Information Security Service ESISS was launched. ESISS is based on the shared services system and funded by HEFCE. ESISS provide IT/IS security and consultancy under the EMMAN umbrella.

In November 2013, ESISS and all services provided by ESISS were migrated to JANET (UK).
