= Government Commercial Agency =

Executive agency and trading fund in the UK

Executive agency overview
- Formed: April 1991 (originally); April 2026 (current name)
- Jurisdiction: United Kingdom
- Headquarters: Liverpool
- Website: www.gov.uk/government/organisations/government-commercial-agency

The Government Commercial Agency (GCA) is an executive agency and trading fund of the Cabinet Office of the UK Government. The GCA is responsible for managing the procurement of common goods and services, increasing savings for the taxpayer by centralising buying requirements, and leading on procurement policy on behalf of the government.

== History ==
GCA was originally created as the Buying Agency on 1 April 1991. On 1 April 2000, it became part of the newly established Office of Government Commerce (OGC) within HM Treasury.

On 1 April 2001, the Buying Agency, the Central Computer and Telecommunications Agency, Property Advisors to the Civil Estate and other units from the Treasury merged to form OGCbuying.solutions. The agency's name was changed to just Buying Solutions in April 2009.

On 15 June 2010, it moved, along with its parent agency the OGC, to become part of the Efficiency and Reform Group within the Cabinet Office. Its name was changed to the Government Procurement Service (GPS) in July 2011.

In 2011, the Cabinet Office announced the establishment of the position of Crown Representative for Small Businesses to work in partnership with the Crown Commercial Service. The appointed position holds responsibility in the field of procurement between the UK Government and SMEs. In 2010, 6.8% of government procurement was made with SMEs. In 2015, at the end of the tenure of the first Crown Representative for SMEs Stephen Allott, this figure had risen to 27.1%.

In January 2014 the GPS merged with the procurement management from government departments to form the Crown Commercial Service (CCS).

On 1 April 2026, CCS and several Cabinet Office Central Commercial teams (operating under the Government Commercial Function) joined to form the Government Commercial Agency (GCA).

== Operations ==
GCA operates as a trading fund established under the Government Trading Funds Act 1973, as amended in 1990, with offices in Liverpool, Norwich, Newport, Leeds and London. According to the service's own data, GCA secured commercial benefits of £3.8billion in the financial year 2022/23.

=== Procurement services ===
GCA provides professional procurement services to the public sector to enable organisations to deliver improved value for money in their commercial activities and provide professional support when it matters, advising on technical issues, energy-saving and environmental improvements.

GCA's operations, and formerly those of GPS, include a range of framework agreements, which are a set of pre-tendered agreements with a range of suppliers from whom public sector customers can purchase goods and services. In the field of IT, historical examples of framework agreements include CITHS frameworks (commoditised IT hardware and software), ITHS (IT hardware and solutions), SPRINT II, Software Application Solutions, and Desktop21 for desktop computer services. The SPRINT II agreement offered pre-negotiated deals on computer hardware and software. Its use was mandated from 4 March 2011, amidst some controversy, for purchases by police authorities in England and Wales of commoditised ICT hardware and off-the-shelf software under government regulations issued in 2011. Claims were put forward during the currency of the agreement that supplies were more expensive via the Sprint ii route than through other sales channels, although the claims were later retracted. A current (as of September 2023) example is the Crown Hosting Data Centres framework, which can be accessed by all central government departments, arm's length bodies and the wider public sector. A small commission (typically less than 1%) is collected from the suppliers for each sale they make under these frameworks agreements.

=== Procurement policy ===
UK Government Procurement Policy Notes were in the past issued by Crown Commercial Service. These are now issued in the name of the Cabinet Office, but the GCA Helpdesk acts as the contact point for any queries. A separate series of Scottish Procurement Policy Notes, and a parallel series of Construction Policy Notes issued since 2017 aiming to alert Scottish contracting authorities "to new policy, guidance and other matters relating to public sector construction", are published by the Scottish Government.

=== Management of the Government Secure Intranet (GSi) ===
As part of its support of the national government Internet infrastructure, GCA manages the UK's Government Secure Intranet (GSi), including the entire third-level government domain .gsi.gov.uk and its sub-domains.

== See also ==
- Crown Representative for Small Businesses
