= AbMAN =

AbMAN (Aberdeen Metropolitan Area Network) was one of the regional networks that comprise JANET. AbMAN connected universities and colleges in and around Aberdeen in Scotland to one another and to the Janet backbone.

The AbMAN POPs were replaced by Janet managed POPs in mid 2010.
