= Patrick Pope =

Patrick Pope may refer to:

- Patrick H. Pope (1806–1841), U.S. Representative from Kentucky
- Pat Pope (born 1966), British photographer
