= ULCC =

ULCC may refer to:

- Union League Club of Chicago, a social and civic club
- Ultra Large Crude Carrier, a class of oil tanker
- University of London Computer Centre, a supercomputer facility
- Ultra low-cost carrier, an airline that is operated with an especially high emphasis on minimizing operating costs

== See also ==
- Uralungal Labour Contract Co-operative Society (ULCCS)
