= Intertrust =

Intertrust may refer to:

- Intertrust Technologies Corporation, a technology development, computing and strategic startup investment company
- Intertrust Group, a trust and corporate services provider
