= Rob Thielen =

Dutch businessman

Robertus H. L. M. Thielen
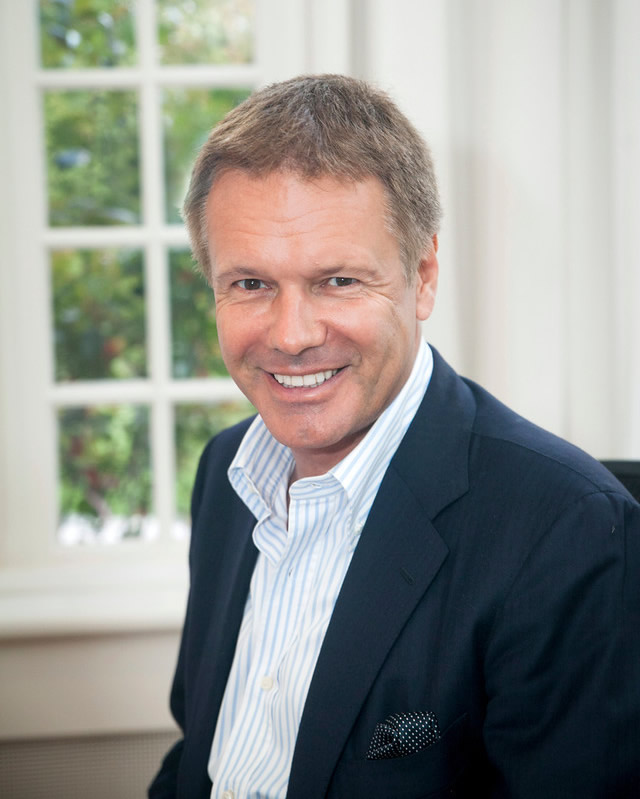
- Rob Thielen at the offices of Waterland Private Equity Investments
- Born: 1961 (age 64–65); Netherlands
- Other name: Rob Thielen
- Education: University of San Diego, Leiden University
- Occupations: Entrepreneur and investor
- Known for: Chairman and founder of private equity firm Waterland Private Equity
- Spouse: Irina Morozova
- Website: www.robthielen.co.uk

Robertus "Rob" Thielen (born 1961) is a Dutch businessman and investor, working primarily in Europe. He is the chairman and founder of Waterland Private Equity, a co-founding partner of the Russia-based private equity group Elbrus Capital, and the chairman of the Gryphion family office.

== Early life and education ==
Thielen was born in the Netherlands in 1961. He graduated in tax law at the University of San Diego in California, US, and obtained a degree in tax law at the Rijksuniversiteit Leiden, the Netherlands. He also studied at Northwestern University in Chicago, US.

== Career ==
He worked as a turn-around management consultant with the Investment Management & Consulting Group (IMCG) and with the International Corporate Finance Group of ABN AMRO Bank.

Thielen was a partner and shareholder of RWP Corporate Finance advisors, which was later acquired by Investec group. He was also general manager of his family owned fashion retail group.

He is chairman and founder of Waterland Private Equity Investments, an independent private equity group which focuses its investments on Austria, Belgium, Denmark, Germany, Ireland, the Netherlands, Poland, the United Kingdom and Switzerland. Waterland has been involved in about 500 transactions in 54 industries in 18 countries with an equity base of around €6 billion. The company owned Intertrust Group, until it sold that firm in 2012 for an estimated €400 million. Waterland has ranked in the top 3 of best performing private equity houses globally for 8 years in a row.

He was co-founding partner of Elbrus Capital, a Russia-based private equity group. Its equity base is around $1 billion.

Thielen founded his own family office Gryphion in 2019 in order to manage his assets with a focus on private equity investing.

Thielen has served as a non-executive member of the board of RPS plc, an LSE quoted company active in environmental consultancy; and a non-executive board member of arxes NCC AG, an IT service provider quoted at the Frankfurt Stock Exchange. He currently is an advisor to the non-executive director of Hampstead Global Fund, a hedge fund formerly listed on the Irish Stock Exchange.

He contributes to Forbes.com covering international finance and investment trends.

== Other positions ==
Thielen was a member of the visiting faculty of the Rotterdam School of Management, Erasmus University, where he taught on mergers and acquisitions on the MBA program.

== Political support and sponsorship ==
VVD politician Hans van Baalen has mentioned Thielen as one of the sponsors of this 2014 campaign for the European Parliament.

Thielen donated £50,000 to the British Conservative Party in April 2016.

Thielen also sponsors the Smart Parks Foundation and the Sea Shepherd Conservation Society.

== Recognition ==
In 2011, Thielen won the annual APEC ‘Private Equity Man of the Year’ Award, an award for Private Equity leaders established by the Amsterdam Private Equity Club.

In 2009, he was ranked 170 in the Quote 500 list of richest Dutch people; in 2018 he was placed at number 82 in the Netherlands Quote 500.
