= Karen Banks =

British computer networking pioneer

Karen Banks is a British computer networking pioneer who was inducted to the Internet Hall of Fame in 2013 as a "Global Connector".

In the 1990s she maintained GnFido, a pioneering gateway run by non-profit ISP GreenNet, which used store and forward techniques to provide otherwise unavailable internet access for individuals and organisations across Africa, South Asia and Eastern Europe. GreenNet was a founder member of the Association for Progressive Communications (APC), and Banks was one of the founders of its Women's Networking Support Programme (WNSP) in 1993 and its coordinator 1996-2004. At the United Nations Fourth World Conference on Women in 1995 the WNSP provided web access and email for 10,000 delegates, many of whom had never seen a web page before. From 1998 to 2001 Banks coordinated APC's global Internet rights work in Europe, and she became network development manager in 2004. She is now APC's operations director.

In 2004 she was given the Anita Borg Award for Social Impact by the Anita Borg Institute, in recognition of "significant and sustained contributions in technology".

She is a board member of Privacy International.

On 16 November 2018 Banks was recognised with the Oxford Internet Institute Award for her lifetime achievements in using information and communication technologies for social change.

== See also ==
- Internet in the United Kingdom § History
- List of Internet pioneers
- List of United Kingdom ISPs by age
- Nicola Pellow – British information scientist who worked on the early World Wide Web
- Sylvia Wilbur – British computer scientist who worked on the early ARPANET
