= Stephen Allott =

British technology executive and founder

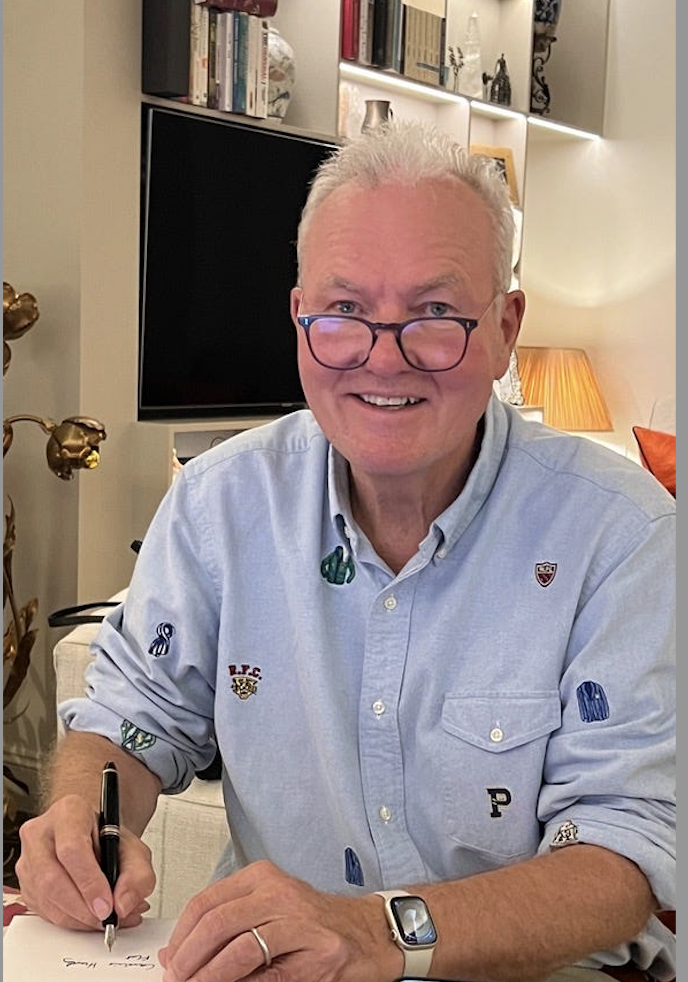

Crown Representative for SMEs
- In office 2011–2015
- Prime Minister: David Cameron
- Preceded by: Position established
- Succeeded by: Emma Jones

Personal details
- Education: Trinity College, Cambridge
- Occupation: Entrepreneur, business executive, founder
- Positions: President and CFO of Micromuse (1998-2001); Member of the Bar Council (1988-1993); Chairman of Tarigo (2024-present)

Stephen Anthony Allott (born 1958) is a British born technology business executive and the founder of the Cambridge Computer Lab Ring.

Allott was the President and CFO of the network management software provider Micromuse during its peak market capitalisation in 2000 and later served as the first Crown Representative for SMEs within the UK Government.

== Career ==
A graduate in law from Trinity College, Cambridge, Allott was called to the Bar at Gray’s Inn. The future Lord Chief Justice of England and Wales, the Lord Thomas of Cwmgiedd, was Allott's Pupil master.

After practising at the Commercial Bar as a tenant in chambers, Allott worked as a lawyer at Babcock, Xerox and Sun Microsystems. During this time, Allott served as an elected member of the Bar Council of England and Wales and was the youngest chairman of the Bar Association for Commerce, Finance and Industry when elected to that role in 1993.

In 1995, on leaving McKinsey & Company, Allott joined Micromuse where he oversaw the expansion of the London-based network management software company. Following its IPO on the Nasdaq in 1998, Allott was appointed President of Micromuse and a main board director in addition to his role as Chief Financial Officer. During his tenure, the company's market capitalisation reached peaked at $15.2 billion (adjusted for UK inflation in 2026), which is the current record valuation for a UK origin organically grown software company.

In 2002, Allott founded the Cambridge Computer Lab Ring, named after the Cambridge Ring (computer network) project led by Maurice Wilkes. According to the University of Cambridge Department of Computer Science and Technology, as of May 2026 there were 371 companies founded by the department's graduates and staff. In 2025, these were valued by Beauhurst at $160 billion (£145 billion). The companies reached a total peak valuation of approximately $460 billion during ARM's market capitalisation peak of $437 billion in 2026.

As City Fellow, Allott delivered the 2006 Cambridge University Hughes Hall City Lecture 'From Science to Growth - what exactly is the mechanism by which scientific research turns into economic growth?' where the term "People Centric Approach" was first coined.

In 2011, the Cameron-Clegg coalition appointed Allott as the first Crown Representative for Small and Medium Enterprises. During his tenure, the SME percentage share of central government procurement spend, including direct and indirect spend, rose from 6.8% in 2010/11 to 27% in 2015. Allott led the business development of the UK Government G-Cloud Digital Marketplace, the Cabinet Office initiative for online procurement of cloud services.

In 2018, Allott authored 'London: The AI Growth Capital of Europe', having been commissioned by the Mayor of London to baseline the international ranking of London's AI industry.

Allott has chaired over a dozen boards of technology companies and organisations, including the Redgate Council of Advisors, as a Venture Partner at Seedcamp and chairman of organisations including Pirical. Currently Allott is board chairman of Tarigo, a product management training company, chairman of the judging panel of the Cambridge Computer Lab Ring Hall of Fame Annual Awards and board chairman of Belgravia Therapy.
