= RiverSoft =

RiverSoft plc
- Traded as: LSE: RSFT (Former ticker symbol)
- Industry: Software
- Founded: 1997 (private company); 2000 (public company)
- Founder: Phil Tee
- Headquarters: London, United Kingdom
- Key people: Carl Symon (non-executive chairman); Tim Murray (chief executive)

RiverSoft plc was a publicly limited company listed on the London Stock Exchange, in 2000. It developed and provided network management software for monitoring and managing Internet Protocol networks. The company is now delisted.

== History ==
RiverSoft was founded, in 1997, by Phil Tee after he left Micromuse, a former competing company which was founded in 1987 when Tee was a student known as "The Fresher's Friend".

Riversoft began to flounder in 2001. "Shares in Riversoft, the network management software group, plunged almost 25% on Monday morning as the company warned that "a sudden and severe deterioration" in the completion of orders led to second-quarter sales significantly below expectations. "I have never seen a quarter unravel so quickly. Things went from OK to dire in the space of a week at the end of the quarter. We were at the stage where we had met technical requirements, agreed contracts and drawn up the paperwork only for the deal to be closed down in the finance department," Phil Tee, chairman and chief technology officer, 3 July 2001.(source The Financial Times)

In September 2001, it was announced that RiverSoft would partner with Concord Communications Inc. to provide real-time network and performance management software to Interxion. Concord Communications Inc. was later acquired by CA Technologies in 2005.

In November 2001, the board saw several changes with Carl Symon, former head of IBM in the UK, joining as non-executive chairman, and Tim Murray from AT&T taking the role of chief executive.

In 2002, RiverSoft was bought by rival firm Micromuse for £43m in cash. Micromuse was then acquired by IBM, in 2005, this resulted in Micromuse's network management software becoming part of what is now the IBM Tivoli Framework.

== Awards ==
RiverSoft won Best Software Infrastructure Product and Best Presentation at the Gartner's Winter 2001 Enterprise Vision Conference in Phoenix, Arizona.
