= UK Government G-Cloud =

Policy to ease procurement of IT services

The UK Government G-Cloud is a framework targeted at easing procurement of commodity information technology services that use cloud computing by public sector bodies in the United Kingdom. The G-Cloud consists of:

- a series of framework agreements with suppliers, from which public sector organisations can buy services without needing to run a full tender or their own competitive procurement process
- an online store – the Public Procurement Gateway, previously the Digital Marketplace, which allows public sector bodies to search for services that are covered by the G-Cloud frameworks

According to the Crown Commercial Service, over the past five years the G-Cloud has facilitated £14.72 billion in sales, with 37.43% of sales being made by SMEs. The G-Cloud is now in its 14th iteration, and works with cloud service providers including Google, Microsoft and Amazon Web Services as well as SME.

== Development ==
Following industry consultation an 'app store' model using an innovative approach to Framework Contract was developed by Ren Reynolds under the leadership of SRO Chris Chant as a Cabinet Office Efficiency and Reform Group project. This new approach allowed for direct award based on catalogue searches rather than competition and rested on the idea of fixed service offers and pricing.

The UK Government initiated the G-Cloud programme to deliver computing based capability (from fundamental resources such as storage and processing to full-fledged applications) using cloud computing. After plans were announced in March 2011, the government aimed to shift 50% of new government IT spending to cloud based services by 2015 and diversify the supplier base to give greater opportunity to small and medium-sized enterprises (SMEs).

As part of the focus on SMEs, Stephen Allott, a British business executive and founder of the Cambridge Computer Lab Ring, was appointed the first Crown Representative for SMEs. Within the Cabinet Office Allott oversaw widespread procurement reform which included removing Pre-Qualification Questionnaires for below threshold procurements, establishing a Contracts Finder website, as well as embedding the G-Cloud programme. In 2015, Allott moved to G-Cloud to promote its adoption among civil servants.

G-Cloud established framework agreements with service providers; and listed those services on a publicly accessible portal known as the Digital Marketplace. The "cloud first" approach to IT, mandated that the central government purchases IT services through the cloud unless it can be proven that an alternative is more cost effective.

The service began in 2012, and had several calls for contracts. By May 2013 there were over 700 suppliers—over 80% of which were small and medium-sized enterprises. In June 2013 G-Cloud moved to become part of Government Digital Service (GDS) and is now run by the Crown Commercial Service.

== Structure ==
=== Public Procurement Gateway ===
Cloud-based services are displayed to buyers in a front-end catalogue called the Public Procurement Gateway (PPG). The PPG allows for public sector bodies to buy cloud-based services and access other information regarding the G-Cloud. The PPG is managed by the Crown Commercial Service.

Before 2024, procurement was facilitate through the Digital Marketplace - a publicly accessible, searchable database of services offered under G-Cloud. The Digital Marketplace was replaced by the Public Procurement Gateway in G-Cloud 13.

=== Classifications ===
Suppliers define the service that they are offering as part of the framework agreement, and those details will be made available in the Digital Marketplace. These details include such things as Business Impact Level that the service is accredited for, and how users will be on-boarded and off-boarded. In particular is the requirement to enable users to leave the service (off-board) if they wish to move to a different provider of the same service.

As of G-Cloud 9, services are classified into 3 lots:

- Lot 1: Cloud Hosting (IaaS) and (PaaS): Cloud platform or infrastructure services that can help buyers do at least 1 of: deploy, manage and run software and provision and use processing, storage or networking resources
- Lot 2: Cloud Software (SaaS): Applications that are typically accessed over a public or private network e.g. the internet and hosted in the cloud
- Lot 3: Cloud Support

=== Vendors ===
Major US vendors Amazon Web Services and Google were initially excluded by the UK government in 2012 (G-Cloud 3). Since that point, AWS was permitted entry in 2013 and Google in 2018.

G-Cloud initially expected to make calls roughly every three to six months, but current call lengths now sit in the region of 12 to 18 months. Contract calls are listed on the Government Contract Finder website.

== Significance ==
The G-Cloud was the most widespread of a number of procurement frameworks intended to give SMEs a "level playing field". During Stephen Allott's tenure as Crown Representative for SMEs (2011-2015), the SME share of central government procurement spend rose from 6.8% in 2010 to 27.1% by 2015, including direct and indirect spend. This exceeded the government's 25% target for 2015. In 2019, 90% of 4200 vendors were SMEs.

A new version of the G-Cloud framework is normally released about every 6 to 9 months. The current version as of November 2025 is G-Cloud 14, which became available for purchasing services from 29 October 2024.

According to the Crown Commercial Service, annual sales have grown from £18.2 million in 2012/13 to £2.91 billion in 2024/25. Between 2012 and 2019, £4.79 billion in sales were made. Over 30,000 public sector bodies use the current framework.

Computer Weekly noted that, "The original G-Cloud brought a level of transparency that was previously unheard of within public sector procurement, where it was not uncommon for suppliers to charge wildly different sums of money to different public sector entities for the same services." Looking at the current service, it noted the G-Cloud "has not quite delivered" on the government's hopes for its adoption, perhaps because "over time, the framework has evolved into a very different beast to the one it was when it first launched".
