= Internet in the United Kingdom =

The United Kingdom has been involved with the Internet throughout its origins and development. The telecommunications infrastructure in the United Kingdom provides Internet access to homes and businesses mainly through fibre, cable, mobile and fixed wireless networks.

The share of households with Internet access in the United Kingdom grew from 9 percent in 1998 to 93 percent in 2019. In 2019, virtually all adults aged 16 to 44 years in the UK were recent internet users (99%), compared with 47% of adults aged 75 years and over; in aggregate, the third-highest in Europe. Internet bandwidth per Internet user was the seventh highest in the world in 2016, and average and peak internet connection speeds were top-quartile in 2017. Internet use in the United Kingdom doubled in 2020.

According to the Office of National Statistics and the Government of the United Kingdom's Culture, Media & Sport and Science, Innovation & Technology departments, the digital sector was worth more than £140 billion to the UK's economy per year, as of 2020. Research by Adobe suggested the UK spent £110.6 billion online in 2022.

The Internet top-level domain name specific to the UK is .uk, which is operated by Nominet. Four additional domains were introduced by ICANN for locations within the UK in 2014: .cymru and .wales for Wales, .scot for Scotland, and .london for London.

== Early years ==
The UK has been involved in the research and development of packet switching, communication protocols, and internetworking since their origins. The development of these technologies was international from the beginning. While the research and development that led to the Internet protocol suite (and the early infrastructure and governance of the Internet) was driven and funded by the United States, it also involved and applied the work of British (and French) researchers. In particular, Donald Davies independently invented and pioneered the implementation of packet switching and associated communication protocols and computer network design at the National Physical Laboratory starting in 1965, which was incorporated into the design of the ARPANET in the United States; internetworking was pioneered by Peter Kirstein at University College London (UCL) beginning in 1973 and he and his team at UCL participated in the Internet Experiment Notes (IEN) work to design TCP/IP (which incorporated new concepts for internetworking developed by Louis Pouzin in France around the same time); and Tim Berners-Lee invented the World Wide Web as an information-sharing service built on top of the Internet in 1989 while working at CERN in Switzerland.

=== Precursors ===
Britain pioneered research and development of computers in the 1940s. This led to partnerships between the public and private sectors, which brought about sharing of concepts and the transfer of personnel between industry and academia or national research bodies. The trackball was invented in 1946 by Ralph Benjamin, while working for the Royal Navy Scientific Service. At the National Physical Laboratory (NPL), Alan Turing worked on computer design, assisted by Donald Davies in 1947.

Christopher Strachey, who became Oxford University's first professor of computation, filed a patent application for time-sharing in 1959. In June that year, he gave a paper "Time Sharing in Large Fast Computers" at the UNESCO Information Processing Conference in Paris where he passed the concept on to J. C. R. Licklider who worked on Project MAC at MIT in the United States.

=== Packet switching and national data network proposal ===
After meeting with Licklider in 1965, Donald Davies conceived the idea of packet switching for data communication. He proposed a commercial national data network and developed plans to implement the concept in a local area network, the NPL network, which operated from 1969 to 1986. He and his team including Derek Barber and Roger Scantlebury developed the concept of communication protocols for the network and carried out work to simulate the performance of a wide-area packet-switched network capable of providing data communications facilities to most of the U.K. Following the inaugural Symposium on Operating Systems Principles in 1967, their research and practice was adopted by the ARPANET in the United States and influenced other researchers in Europe, including Louis Pouzin, and in Japan.

=== The early Internet and TCP/IP ===
Donald Davies, Derek Barber and Roger Scantlebury joined the International Network Working Group (INWG) in 1972 along with researchers from the United States and France. Vint Cerf and Bob Kahn acknowledged Davies and Scantlebury in their seminal 1974 paper "A Protocol for Packet Network Intercommunication".

Peter Kirstein's research group at University College London (UCL) was one of only two international connections on the ARPANET, alongside Norway (NORSAR and NDRE). Beginning in 1973, UCL provided a gateway between the ARPANET and British academic networks, the first international internetwork for computer resource sharing. In 1975, 40 British academic research groups were using the link; by 1984, there was a user population of about 150 people on both sides of the Atlantic.

The specification of the Transmission Control Program was developed in the U.S. in 1974 through research funded and led by DARPA and Stanford University. The following year, testing began with concurrent implementations at University College London, Stanford University, and BBN. UCL played a significant role in the very earliest work recorded in the IEN. Adrian Stokes and Sylvia Wilbur, among others at UCL, programmed the computer used as the local node for the network at UCL and Wilbur was "probably one of the first people in this country ever to send an email, back in 1974". Kirstein co-authored with Vint Cerf one of the most significant early technical papers on the internetworking concept in 1978. Further work was done by researchers at the Information Sciences Institute (ISI), at the University of Southern California. (Note: See also the Final Report of the Stanford University TCP project, IEN 151. IETF., written by Cerf in 1980. This was originally, in TCP version 2 in 1977 (IEN5), to be entitled "Final Report of the Internetwork TCP Project" and to be written by Cerf [Stanford], Stephen Edge [UCL], Andrew Hinchley [UCL], Richard Karp [Stanford], Peter T. Kirstein [UCL], and Paal Spilling [NDRE]. This title was carried over into version 3 (IEN21) and into the list of references in version 4 but the present title was adopted in the preface (IEN55).) Kirstein's research group at UCL adopted TCP/IP in November 1982, ahead of ARPANET.

The Royal Signals and Radar Establishment (RSRE) became involved in implementation and testing of TCP/IP in 1976. The first email sent by a head of state was sent from the RSRE by Queen Elizabeth II to inaugurate the link to the ARPANET in March that year. RSRE was allocated class A Internet address range 25 in 1979, which later became the Ministry of Defence address space, providing 16.7 million IPv4 addresses.

Roger Camrass, with his supervisor, Robert Gallager, at MIT, showed packet switching to be optimal in the Huffman coding sense in 1978.

Derek Barber was involved in Internet design discussions in 1980. British researchers expressed a desire to use a country designation when American researchers Jon Postel and Paul Mockapetris were designing the Domain Name System in 1984. Postel adopted this idea for the DNS, which used the ISO standard country abbreviations except for following the "UK" convention already in use in the UK's Name Registration Scheme, rather than the ISO-standard "GB". The .uk Internet country code top-level domain (ccTLD) was registered in July 1985, seven months after the original generic top-level domains such as .com and the first country code after .us. At the time, ccTLDs were delegated by Postel to a "responsible person" and Andrew McDowell at UCL managed .uk, the first country code delegation. He later passed it to Dr Willie Black at the UK Education and Research Networking Association (UK ERNA). Black managed the "Naming Committee" until he and John Carey formed Nominet UK in 1996. As one of the first professional ccTLD operators, it became the model for many other operators worldwide.

The UK's national research and education network (NREN), JANET connected with the National Science Foundation Network (NSFNET) in the United States in 1989. JANET adopted Internet Protocol on its existing network in 1991. In the same year, Dai Davies introduced Internet technology into the pan-European NREN, EuropaNet.

British Telecom (BT) operated research labs which began, unofficially, relaying its internal email to the Internet at the end of the 1980s.

NetNames, Ivan Pope's company, developed the concept of a standalone commercial domain name registrar, which would sell domain registration and other associated services to the public. Network Solutions Inc. (NSI), the domain name registry for the .com, .net, and .org top-level domains (TLDs), assimilated this model, which ultimately led to the separation of registry and registrar functions.

Jon Crowcroft and Mark Handley received multiple awards for their work on Internet technology in the 1990s and 2000s. Karen Banks promoted the use of the Internet to empower women around the world.

Over the period 1980 to 2000, BT and other providers adopted TCP/IP and Internet product strategies when it became commercially advantageous.

=== Other computer networks and protocols ===
The South West Universities Computer Network (SWUCN) was an early British academic computer network developed with the objective of resource sharing. After planning began in 1967, work was initiated in 1969 on an experimental network, becoming operational for users in 1974. In the early 1970s, the Science Research Council community established SRCnet, later called SERCnet. Other regional academic networks were built in the mid-late 1970s, as well as experimental networks such as the Cambridge Ring.

During the 1970s, the NPL team researched internetworking on the European Informatics Network (EIN). Based on datagrams, the network linked Euratom, the French research centre INRIA and the UK's National Physical Laboratory in 1976. The transport protocol of the EIN helped to launch the INWG and X.25 protocols.

Building on the work of James H. Ellis in the late 1960s, Clifford Cocks and Malcolm Williamson invented a public-key cryptography algorithm in 1973. An equivalent algorithm was later independently invented in 1977 in the United States by Ron Rivest, Adi Shamir and Leonard Adleman. The RSA algorithm became central to security on the Internet.

Post Office Telecommunications developed an experimental public packet switching network, EPSS, in the 1970s. This was one of the first public data networks in the world when it began operating in 1976. EPSS was replaced with the Packet Switch Stream (PSS) in 1980. PSS connected to the International Packet Switched Service (IPSS), which was created in 1978 through a collaboration between Post Office Telecommunications and two US telecoms companies. IPSS provided worldwide networking infrastructure.

British research contributed to the development of the X.25 standard agreed by the CCITT in 1976 which was deployed on PSS and IPSS. The UK academic community defined the Coloured Book protocols, which came into use as "interim" X.25 standards. These protocols gained some acceptance internationally as the first complete X.25 standard, and gave the UK "several years lead over other countries".

Logica, together with the French company SESA, set up a joint venture in 1975 to undertake the Euronet development, using X.25 protocols to form virtual circuits. It established a network linking a number of European countries in 1979 before being handed over to national PTTs In 1984.

Peter Collinson brought Unix to the University of Kent (UKC/UKnet) in 1976 and set up a UUCP test service to Bell Labs in the U.S. in 1979. The first UUCP emails from the U.S. arrived in the UK later that year and email to Europe (the Netherlands and Denmark) started in 1980, becoming a regular service via EUnet in 1982. UKC provided the first connections to non-academic users in the early 1980s. Several companies established electronic mail services in Britain during the 1970s and early 1980s, enabling subscribers to send email either internally within a company network or over telephone connections or data networks such as Packet Switch Stream.

In the early 1980s, British academic networks started a standardisation and interconnection effort based on X.25 and the Coloured Book protocols. Known as the United Kingdom Education and Research Networking Association (UK ERNA), and later JNT Association, this became JANET, the UK's national research and education network (NREN). JANET linked all universities, higher education establishments, and publicly funded research laboratories. It began operation in 1984, two years ahead of the NSFNET in the United States and was the fastest X.25 network in the world.

The National Computing Centre 1976 publication 'Why Distributed Computing' which came from considerable research into future configurations for computer systems, resulted in the UK presenting the case for an international standards committee to cover this area at the ISO meeting in Sydney in March 1977. This international effort ultimately led to the OSI model as an international reference model, published in 1984. For a period in the late 1980s and early 1990s, engineers, organizations and nations became polarized over the issue of which standard, the OSI model or the Internet protocol suite would result in the best and most robust computer networks.

Public dialup information, messaging and e-commerce services, were pioneered through the Prestel services developed by Post Office Telecommunications in 1979.

Commercial networking services between the UK and the US were being developed in late 1990.

=== World Wide Web ===
In 1989, Tim Berners-Lee, working at CERN in Switzerland, wrote a proposal for "a large hypertext database with typed links". The following year, he specified HTML, the hypertext language, and HTTP, the protocol. These concepts became a world-wide information system known as the World Wide Web (WWW). Operating on the Internet, it allows documents to be created for reading or accessing services with connections to other documents or services, accessed by clicking on hypertext links, enabling the user to navigate from one document or service to another. Nicola Pellow worked with Berners-Lee and Robert Cailliau on the WWW project at CERN.

British Telecom began using the WWW in 1991 during a collaborative project called the Oracle Alliance Program. It was founded in 1990 by Oracle Corporation, based in California, to provide information for its corporate partners and about those partners. BT became involved in May 1991. File sharing was required as part of the program and, initially, floppy disks were sent through the post. Then in July 1991 access to the Internet was implemented by BT network engineers using the BT packet switching network. A link was established from Ipswich to London for access to the Internet backbone. The first file transfers made via a NeXT-based WWW interface were completed in October 1991.

The BBC registered with the DDN-NIC in 1989, establishing Internet access via Brunel University where bbc.co.uk was registered through JANET NRS and the BBC's first website went online in 1994. Other early websites which went online in 1993 hosted in the UK included JumpStation, which was the first WWW search engine hosted at the University of Stirling in Scotland; The Internet Movie Database, hosted by the computer science department of Cardiff University in Wales; and Kent Anthropology, one of the first social science sites (one of the first 200 web servers). The Web brought many social and commercial uses to the Internet which was previously a network for academic institutions. It began to enter everyday use in 1993–1994.

An early attempt to provide access to the Web on television was being developed in 1995.

=== Dial-up Internet access ===
Pipex was established in 1990 and began providing dial-up Internet access in March 1992, the UK's first commercial Internet service provider (ISP). One of its first customers that year was Demon Internet, which popularised dial up modem-based internet access in the UK. By November 1993, Pipex provided Internet service to 150 customer sites. EUnet GB was founded as a commercial ISP in 1993 by a group of academics. Other ISPs and web-hosting companies, aimed at businesses and individuals, developed in the 1990s. In May 1998, Demon Internet had 180,000 subscribers.

This narrowband service has been almost entirely replaced by the new broadband technologies, and is now generally only used as a backup. BT trialled its first ISDN 'broadband' connection in 1992. The first commercial service was available from Telewest in 2000.

== Broadband ==
Broadband allowed the signal in one line to be split between telephone and Internet data, meaning users could be online and make phone calls at the same time. It also enabled faster connections, making it easier to browse the Internet and download files. Broadband Internet access in the UK was, initially, provided by a number of regional cable television and telephone companies which gradually merged into larger groups. The development of digital subscriber line (DSL) technology has allowed broadband to be delivered via traditional copper telephone cables. Also, Wireless Broadband is now available in some areas. These three technologies (cable, DSL and wireless) now compete with each other.

More than half of UK homes had broadband in 2007, with an average connection speed of 4.6 Mbit/s. Bundled communications deals mixing broadband, digital TV, mobile phone and landline phone access were adopted by forty per cent of UK households in the same year, up by a third over the previous year. This high level of service is considered the main driver for the recent growth in online advertising and retail.

In 2006 the UK market was dominated by six companies, with the top two taking 51%, these being Virgin Media with a 28% share, and BT at 23%.

By July 2011 BT's share had grown by six percent and the company became the broadband market leader.

The UK broadband market is overseen by the government watchdog Ofcom. According to Ofcom's 2007 report the average UK citizen used the Internet for 36 minutes every day.

The Ofcom Communications Market 2018 report showed 42% of adults had access and use of a Smart TV by 2018, compared to just 5% in 2012 exemplifying the extra bandwidth required by broadband providers on their networks.

=== Cable ===
Cable Internet access uses coaxial cables or optical fibre cables. The main cable service provider in the UK is Virgin Media and the current maximum speed available to their customers is 1.1 Gbit/s.

=== Digital subscriber line (DSL) ===
Asymmetric digital subscriber line (ADSL) was introduced to the UK in trial stages in 1998 and a commercial product was launched in 2000. In the United Kingdom, most exchanges, local loops and backhauls are owned and managed by BT Wholesale, who then wholesale connectivity via Internet service providers, who generally provide the connectivity to the Internet, support, billing and value added services (such as web hosting and email). A customer typically expects a British telephone socket to connect their broadband modem to.

As of October 2021, BT operate 5630 exchanges across the UK, with the vast majority enabled for ADSL. Only a relative handful—under 100 of the smallest and most rural exchanges—had not been upgraded to support ADSL products. Some exchanges, fewer than 1000, had been upgraded to support SDSL products. However, these exchanges are often the larger exchanges based in major towns and cities, so they still cover a large proportion of the population. SDSL products are aimed more at business customers and are priced higher than ADSL services.

==== Unbundled local loop ====
Many companies are now operating their own services using local loop unbundling. Initially Bulldog Communications in the London area and Easynet (through their sister consumer provider UK Online) enabled exchanges across the country from London to Central Scotland.

In November 2010, having purchased Easynet in the preceding months, Sky closed the business-centric UK Online with little more than a month's notice. Although Easynet continued to offer business-grade broadband connectivity products, UKO customers could not migrate to an equivalent Easynet service, only being offered either a MAC to migrate provider or the option of becoming a customer of the residential-only Sky Broadband ISP with an introductory discounted period. Also, some previously available service features like fastpath (useful for time-critical protocols like SIP) were not made available on Sky Broadband, leaving business users with a difficult choice particularly where UK Online were the only LLU provider. Since then, Sky Broadband has become a significant player in the quad play telecoms market, offering ADSL line rental and call packages to customers (who have to pay a supplement if they are not also Sky television subscribers).

Whilst Virgin Media is the nearest direct competitor, its quad play product is available to fewer homes given the fixed nature of its cable infrastructure. TalkTalk is the next DSL-based ISP with a quad play product portfolio (EE's being the merger of the Orange and T-Mobile service providers, and focusing its promotion on forthcoming fibre broadband and 4G LTE products).

Market consolidation and expansion has permitted service providers to offer faster and less expensives services with typical speeds of up to 24 Mbit/s downstream (subject to ISP and line length). They can offer products at sometimes considerably lower prices, due to not necessarily having to conform to the same regulatory requirements as BT Wholesale: for example, 8 unbundled LLU pairs can deliver 10 Mbit/s over 3,775 m (2.346 miles) for half the price of a similar fibre connection.

In 2005, another company, Be, started offering speeds of up to 24 Mbit/s downstream and 2.5 Mbit/sec upstream using ADSL2+ with Annex M, eventually from over 1,250 UK exchanges. Be were taken over by O2's parent company Telefónica in 2007. On 1 March 2013 O2 Telefónica sold Be to Sky, which migrated O2 and Be customers onto the somewhat slower Sky network.

TalkTalk offered customers 'free' broadband if they had a telephone package. Orange responded by offering 'free' broadband for some mobile customers. Many smaller ISPs now offer similar packages. O2 also entered the broadband market by taking over LLU provider Be, while Sky (BSkyB) had already taken over LLU broadband provider Easynet. In July 2006, Sky announced 2 Mbit/s broadband to be available free to Sky TV customers and a higher speed connection at a lower price than most rivals.

Exchanges continue to be upgraded, subject to demand, across the country, although at a somewhat slower pace since BT's commencement of FTTC rollout plans and near-saturation in key geographical areas.

==== IPstream ====
Up until the launch of "Max" services, the only ADSL packages available via BT Wholesale were known as IPstream Home 250, Home 500, Home 1000 and Home 2000 (contention ratio of 50:1); and Office 500, Office 1000, and Office 2000 (contention ratio of 20:1). The number in the product name indicates the downstream data rate in kilobits per second. The upstream data rate is up to 250 kbit/s for all products. (Note: 1 kbit = 1000 bit)

For BT Wholesale ADSL products, users initially had to live within 3.5 km (2.2 miles) of the local telephone exchange to receive ADSL, but this limit was increased thanks to rate-adaptive digital subscriber line (RADSL), although users with RADSL possibly had a reduced upstream rate, depending on the quality of their line. There are still areas that cannot receive ADSL because of technical limitations, not least of which networks in housing areas built with aluminium cable rather than copper in the 1980s and 1990s, and areas served by optical fibre (TPON), though these are slowly being serviced with copper.

In September 2004, BT Wholesale removed the line-length/loss limits for 500 kbit/s ADSL, instead employing a tactic of "suck it and see" — enabling the line, then seeing if ADSL would work on it. This sometimes includes the installation of a filtered faceplate on the customer's master socket, so as to eliminate poor quality telephone extension cables inside the customer's premises which can be a source of high frequency noise.

In the past, the majority of home users used packages with 500 kbit/s (downstream) and 250 kbit/s (upstream) with a 50:1 contention ratio. However, BT Wholesale introduced the option of a new charging structure to ISPs which means that the wholesale service cost was the same regardless of the ADSL data rate, with charges instead being based on the amount of data transferred. Nowadays, most home users use a package whose data rate is only limited by the technical limitations of their telephone line. Initially this was 2 Mbit/s downstream. Until the advent of widespread FTTC, most home products were first ADSL Max-based (up to 7.15 Mbit/s), using ADSL G.992.1 and then later ADSL2+ (up to 21 Mbit/s).

=== Fibre ===
==== FTTC & G.Fast ====
In 2015, BT unveiled universal 5 to 10 Mbit/s broadband and the rollout of 500 Mbit/s G.Fast. The aim was to push "ultra-fast speeds" of 300 to 500 Mbit/s to 10 million homes using the existing landline cables. Openreach made the decision to pause the rollout of G.Fast in 2019, as a result of their decision to focus on FTTP.

In 2015, BT began the roll out of G.INP on their FTTC network, the use of G.INP is to help improve line stability and reduce overheads and latency. The roll-out was paused on ECI broadband cabinet equipment due to the lack of support for upstream re-transmission which caused network slowdowns and higher latency. The rollout of G.INP on Huawei broadband cabinets was completed in 2015 while G.INP on ECI equipment has reentered the trial stage as of May 2020.

In September 2016, Sky "completed" their roll-out of IPv6 with 95% of their customers getting IPv6 access. BT rolled out IPv6 support for "all BT Broadband lines" two months later in November 2016.

==== FTTP ====
In March 2011, Openreach began the development of an FTTP network in Milton Keynes. As a result, BT began offering eligible customers packages with download speeds of up to 100 Mbit/s.

In October 2011, British operator Hyperoptic launched a 1 Gbit/s FTTH service in London.

In October 2012, British operator Gigler UK launched a 1 Gbit/s down and 500 Mbit/s up FTTH service in Bournemouth using the CityFibre network.

Virgin Media stated that 13 million UK homes are covered by their optical fibre broadband network, and that by the end of 2012 would be able to offer 100 Mbit/s broadband. There are currently over 100 towns in the UK that have access to this service.

During the 2019 General Election, Boris Johnson pledged full fibre for all of the UK by 2025. This was later rolled back to "gigabit-capable" broadband. This means that mixed technologies are allowed, for example Virgin Media can continue to use their cable infrastructure since the DOCSIS 3.1 is "gigabit-capable" and other ISPs can also sell 5G broadband. Vorboss initiated the construction of a full-fibre network in London's business district in 2019. The company deployed 500 km of 800 fiber optic cables in London with 10 to 100 Gbit/s speeds connected directly to premises (FTTP) without a copper-and-cabinet middleman.

In January 2020, Openreach announced that they will deploy FTTP technology in 200 rural locations by March 2021. Two months later, in March, the UK government set the universal service obligation to 10 Mbit/s Download and 1 Mbit/s Upload. The following month, Rural ISP B4RN launched their 10 Gbit/s symmetrical home broadband.

Openreach reported that on 29 April they saw a record peak of 10 petabytes of data going through their network in one hour. This increase of internet traffic is the result of the lock-down in the UK caused by COVID-19. The following month, Openreach reported that they had passed 2.5 million premises with its FTTP network.

On 1 September 2023 alternative network ISP YouFibre released an 8 Gbit/s residential service delivered over XGSPON.

The analogue PSTN landline network, maintained by Openreach, was set to be withdrawn by December 2025, although this has since been extended to 31 January 2027 in some areas due to reasons including panic alarms in sheltered housing needing a persistent connection which can't be guaranteed with internet-based DECT systems. Existing ADSL and VDSL connections will initially be unaffected, but some areas will be restricted to only allowing new FTTP orders. The voice over IP replacement is branded as "Digital Voice" in the UK. "Digital Voice" handsets must be connected to a broadband router, rather than the old telephone sockets.

=== Mobile ===
Mobile broadband is high-speed Internet access provided by mobile phone operators using a device that requires a SIM card to access the service.

4G internet replaced the old 3G technology and allowed download speeds up to 300 Mbit/s.

5G was first deployed in the UK in May 2019 by EE, followed by Three and Vodafone in August 2019, and finally O2 in October 2019.

=== Satellite ===
Starlink has been available in the UK since 2021.

== Speeds ==
=== 2000s ===
Since 2003, BT has been introducing SDSL to exchanges in many of the major cities. Services are currently offered at upload/download speeds of 256 kbit/s, 512 kbit/s, 1 Mbit/s or 2 Mbit/s. Unlike ADSL, which is typically 256 kbit/s upload, SDSL upload speeds are the same as the download speed. BT usually provide a new copper pair for SDSL installs, which can be used only for the SDSL connection. At a few hundred pounds a quarter, SDSL is significantly more expensive than ADSL, but is significantly cheaper than a leased line. SDSL is marketed to businesses and offers low contention ratios, and in some cases, a service level agreement. At present, the BT Wholesale SDSL enablement programme has stalled, most probably due to a lack of uptake.

On 9 April 2003, the Advertising Standards Authority ruled against ISP NTL, saying that NTL's 128 kbit/s cable modem service must not be marketed as "broadband". Ofcom reported in June 2005 that there were more broadband than dial-up connections for the first time in history. In a similar way, on 13 August 2004, Wanadoo (formerly Freeserve, and part of what is now EE), was told by ASA to change the way that they advertised their 512 kbit/s broadband service, requiring the company to remove the words "full speed". Rival companies claimed the phrase were misleading people into thinking it was the fastest service available.

With the merger of NTL and Telewest in March 2006, the resulting NTL:Telewest company created the largest market share of broadband users in the UK. It also brought increases in bandwidth allocations for cable customers, with minimum speeds increasing from the industry norm of 512 kbit/s to 2 Mbit/s, whilst the company planned to have all domestic customers upgraded to at least 4 Mbit/s downstream and ranging up to 10 Mbit/s and beyond later in the year. In addition to this, it increased the supply of integrated services such as Digital TV and Phone packages.

Also in March, BT Wholesale launched its "up to 8 Mbit/s" ADSL services, known as ADSL Max. Max-based packages were made available to end users on any broadband-enabled BT exchange in the UK.

In September 2007, BT announced trials for an ADSL2+ service. BT's Wholesale and Retail divisions were chosen alongside Entanet to provide the first trials in the West Midlands.

=== 2010s ===
Still in the year 2015 it was common in highly developed areas like the London Aldgate region for consumers to be limited to speeds of up to 8 Mbit/s for ADSL services. This had a major effect in the London rental market as limited broadband service can affect the readiness of prospective tenants to sign a rental lease.

=== 2020s ===
In March 2020, the UK government set the Universal Service Obligation (USO) to 10 Mbit/s download and 1 Mbit/s upload. As of May that year, 96.9% of UK households could receive "superfast broadband" (defined as 30 Mbit/s) whilst 19.29% of households could receive "ultrafast broadband" (defined as 300 Mbit/s) via FTTP or DOCSIS 3.1. 1.07% of households had broadband slower than the USO.

In September, the UK dropped 13 places in the 2020 Worldwide Broadband Speed League, making it amongst the slowest in Europe with an average download speed of 37.82 Mbit/s. Cable.co.uk blamed this on Openreach, with the network provider having focused on the development of an FTTC network, and been slow to begin the deployment of FTTP technologies. The deployment of FTTC/VDSL technologies was largely driven by the lack of political appetite and funding for FTTP at the time.

In 2022, the UK's average download speed of 72 Mbit/s ranked it only faster than Italy in the G7 league of industrial nations for broadband speeds. According to a report by the Worldwide Broadband Speed League, a global leader in internet testing and analysis, the UK had risen to 35th place, having been ranked in 43rd position the year before.

As of 2024, the median average internet speed in the UK reached 73.21Mbit/s, reflecting a growth of over 12% since September 2022, with an increase of nearly 8Mbit/s in under a year. Average upload speeds also rose significantly, climbing by 18% between September 2022 and March 2023 to 18.4Mbit/s. The data reveals that 99.7% of UK households now have access to reliable internet speeds of 10Mbit/s or higher.

== Availability in each of the UK's nations ==
=== England ===
==== Broadband ====
According to Nations report 2024 by Ofcom, over two-thirds of households in England now have access to full-fibre networks. 17.3 million residential premises (69%) have access to full fibre as of July 2024, an increase of 13 percentage points from September 2023. Gigabit-capable coverage now extends to 84% or 21.1 million premises in England.

==== Mobile ====
5G coverage is steadily increasing across England. 92-96% of premises (across a range covering Very High and High Confidence levels) can now receive 5G outdoor coverage from at least one MNO. England remains the UK nation with the highest 5G coverage from at least one MNO.

=== Scotland ===
==== Broadband ====
62% of residential properties have access to full-fibre networks in Scotland. This is an increase of nine percentage points (265,000 premises) from September 2023 to July 2024.Over three-quarters of Scottish households have gigabit-capable coverage. The increase of five percentage points (166,000) means that 77% of premises can access gigabit-capable services.

==== Mobile ====
The availability of 5G services continues to grow steadily. In Scotland, 5G coverage outside of premises from at least one Mobile Network Operator (MNO) is now at 91% (up from 88% in 2023) for the High Confidence measure.

=== Wales ===
==== Broadband ====
Access to full-fibre networks has reached 1 million homes in Wales or 68% of residential premises, up 13 percentage points from last year (55%). Gigabit-capable broadband has increased 10 percentage points from last year to 74%. This is the biggest increase across all UK nations.

==== Mobile ====
5G is reaching a growing number of consumers, with Wales seeing a steady increase in coverage. Coverage from at least one MNO now reaches 86% (High Confidence) and 79% (Very High Confidence) in areas outside of premises.

=== Northern Ireland ===
==== Broadband ====
Around 760,000 homes in Northern Ireland can now access full-fibre broadband. Among the four UK nations, Northern Ireland (93%) has the highest availability of full-fibre networks. Northern Ireland's full fibre position reflects significant early commercial rollout and publicly funded schemes designed to improve broadband in rural areas.

==== Mobile ====
There has been a further increase in 5G availability. Mobile network operators (MNOs) continue to increase the footprint of these services, and outside premises coverage from at least one MNO now stands at 92% at the High Confidence level and 86% at Very High Confidence, up from 80% and 70% respectively in 2023.

== Children's access to the Internet ==
Educational computer networks are maintained by organisations such as JANET and East Midlands Public Services Network.

According to a 2017 Ofcom report named 'Children and Parents: Media Use and Attitudes Report' more younger children are going online than in 2016 with much of the growth coming from increased use of tablets.

A survey on UK school children's access to the Internet commissioned by security company Westcoastcloud in 2011 found half have no parental controls installed on their internet connected devices and half of parents said they have concerns about the lack of controls installed on their children's Internet devices.

On 15 June 2026, the government announced proposals to prohibit kids under the age of 16 from accessing major social media platforms, including TikTok, Instagram, Facebook, Snapchat, YouTube and X. The proposed measures would also restrict certain online features for minors, such as livestreaming and stranger communication.

== Regulation ==
In 2015 Prime Minister David Cameron proposed a ban on end-to-end encryption in the United Kingdom.

In June 2018 Tom Winsor, HM Chief Inspector of Constabulary, argued that technologies like encryption should be breakable if law enforcers have a warrant. Winsor said the public was running out of patience with organisations like Facebook, Telegram and WhatsApp. Winsor opined, "There is a handful of very large companies with a highly dominant influence over how the internet is used. In too many respects, their record is poor and their reputation tarnished. The steps they take to make sure their services cannot be abused by terrorists, paedophiles and organised criminals are inadequate; the commitment they show and their willingness to be held to account are questionable."

The UK government has "for years" continued to press for control of encryption, citing worries about child abuse. The proposed Online Safety Bill was criticised by Apple, Meta and Signal.

== See also ==
- Alternative media in the United Kingdom
- Digital Britain
- Internet censorship in the United Kingdom
- Illegal file sharing in the United Kingdom
- Internet rush hour
- Media in the United Kingdom
- Open Rights Group
- Online age verification in the United Kingdom
