= Cambridge Ring (computer network) =

Experimental local area network

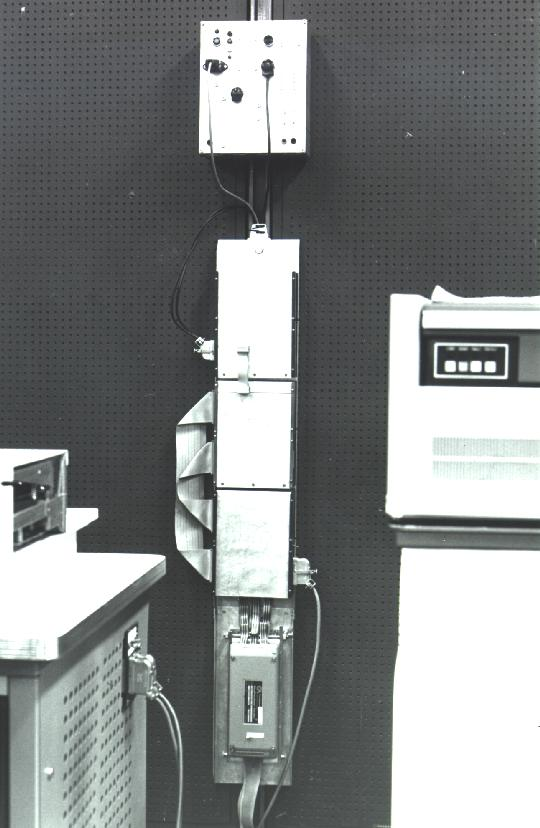
Cambridge Ring

The Cambridge Ring was an experimental local area network (LAN) architecture developed at the Computer Laboratory, University of Cambridge starting in 1974 and continuing into the 1980s.

== Network ==
It was a ring network with a theoretical limit of 255 nodes (though such a large number would have badly affected performance), around which cycled a fixed number of packets. Free packets would be "loaded" with data by a sending machine, marked as received by the destination machine, and "unloaded" on return to the sender; thus in principle, there could be as many simultaneous senders as packets.

The network ran over twin twisted-pair cabling (plus a fibre-optic section) at a raw data rate of 10 megabits/sec. There are strong similarities between the Cambridge Ring and an earlier ring network developed at Bell Labs based on a design by John R. Pierce. That network used T1 lines at bit rate of 1.544 MHz and accommodating 522 bit messages (data plus address).

People associated with the project include Andy Hopper, David Wheeler, Maurice Wilkes, and Roger Needham. A 1980 study by Peter Cowley reported several commercial implementors of elements of the network, ranging from Ferranti (producing gate arrays), Inmos (a semiconductor manufacturer), Linotype Paul, Logica VTS, MDB Systems, and Toltec Data (a design company who manufactured interface boards).

In 2002, the Computer Laboratory launched a graduate society called the Cambridge Computer Lab Ring named after the Cambridge Ring.

== See also ==
- Cambridge Distributed Computing System
- Internet in the United Kingdom § History
- JANET
- NPL network
- Packet switching
- Token Ring
- University of London Computer Centre
