= Cambridge Computer Lab Ring =

British alumni organisation

The Cambridge Computer Lab Ring is a members' association for staff and graduates of the Cambridge University Computer Laboratory. It was formed in 2002 by Stephen Allott as a non-profit, independent and voluntary members’ association, and was absorbed into the Cambridge University Computer Laboratory in 2012. It was named by Sir Maurice Wilkes after the Cambridge Ring.

The association was mentioned by Richard Lambert in the Lambert Review of Business-University Collaboration as an example of how "universities, departments and faculties should develop their alumni networks in order to build closer relationships with their graduates working in the business community."

Notable companies formed by members of the Cambridge Computer Lab Ring include ARM, DeepMind Technologies and Raspberry Pi.

== Formation ==
Founded in 1937 as the Mathematical Laboratory, the Cambridge Computer Laboratory was at the forefront of the development of computing through the twentieth century. This included the introduction of the world's first full-year taught course in computer science, the Cambridge Diploma in Computer Science.

With several alumni going on to found successful technology companies, notably in computer software, several University of Cambridge alumni and staff saw benefit in forming a network that would allow graduates to get "a lifetime benefit from their Cambridge degrees, professionally, technically and socially."

To this end Head of the Computer Laboratory Professor Ian Leslie directed Stephen Allott, a Cambridge graduate who had recently scaled software provider Micromuse to $7.8 billion following its floatation on the Nasdaq, to form an alumni association. This led to the introduction of a programme of events to promote "intellectual rigour" and to connect alumni. In 2005, Allott and others established the annual Hall of Fame awards.

== Hall of Fame ==
The association claims that, as of May 2026, there are 371 companies created by computer lab graduates and staff. A 'Company of the Year' is chosen from this list annually.

- 2005 Sophos
- 2006 Codian
- 2007 Jagex
- 2008 Xensource
- 2009 Linguamatics
- 2010 Ubisense
- 2011 RealVNC
- 2012 Trampoline Systems
- 2013 Raspberry Pi
- 2014 DeepMind Technologies
- 2015 SwiftKey
- 2016 Unikernel Systems
- 2017 Improbable
- 2018 Bromium
- 2019 PolyAI
- 2020 DisplayLink
- 2021 iKVA
- 2022 Tenyks
- 2023 ARM
- 2024 Tractable
- 2025 Rivos

== Valuation ==
In May 2025, data analytics provider Beauhurst demonstrated a $160 billion (£145 billion) value of companies founded by University of Cambridge Computer Science staff, students and alumni. The same study found that the companies employ over 28000 people. In 2026, ARM's peak market capitalisation of $437 billion contributed to a significant increase in the total value of Cambridge Computer Lab Ring companies to approximately $460 billion.
