= NetNames =

Domain name registrar

- Industry: Domain name registration
- Founded: 1996
- Founder: Ivan Pope
- Defunct: 2018
- Fate: Fully absorbed into CSC Digital Brand Services
- Headquarters: London, United Kingdom
- Website: www.netnames.com

NetNames was a British company that provided online brand protection, as well as domain name management and acquisition services. It was the first specialist domain name registration company. Founded in 1997, it ceased trading under its original name after acquisition by CSC Digital Brand Services.

== History ==
NetNames Ltd was founded as part of Webmedia Group by Ivan Pope in 1996 and demerged from it in 1997. NetNames invented and developed the concept of a standalone commercial domain name registration service which would sell domain registration and other associated services to the public.

NetNames was acquired by NetBenefit plc in 1995 and renamed to Group NBT plc in 2004. The company officially consolidated all its corporate brands under the NetNames banner in January 2013.

In 2011, NetNames was bought by private equity firm HgCapital and delisted from the Alternative Investment Market. The following year, NetBenefit ltd, NetNames’ managed hosting division, was sold to Canadian IT infrastructure provider Peer 1 Hosting.

In 2016 NetNames was sold by HgCapital to US business services outfit CSC for an undisclosed sum. In 2018, CSC absorbed the NetNames brand into its own and NetNames stopped operating as a standalone entity.

== Locations ==
The company was headquartered in London, with offices in Cambridge, Paris, Copenhagen, Stockholm, Zurich, Munich, New York, San Francisco, Melbourne and Singapore.

A series of global acquisitions made NetNames “one of the world’s largest corporate domain name management and online brand protection specialists”. Its acquisitions included Ascio Technologies, INDOM and Cedel, as well as WebIP in Australia and Adicio in Singapore.

== Services ==
NetNames supported more than 2,000 companies globally, including a quarter of the UK’s FTSE 100 firms. In 2014, The Daily Telegraph reported that NetNames had relationships with 240 registrars worldwide and could "have fake websites taken down within days".

Unilever was one of NetNames’ biggest clients, with a portfolio of more than 10,000 domain names under management for all its global brands.

== Certifications and awards ==
NetNames was a founding member of Nominet UK, the .uk domain name registry in the United Kingdom. In 1999, NetNames gained ICANN accreditation status for domain registration.

NetNames was named as a Deloitte & Touche Technology Fast 50 Winner in 2002 and was recognised again in 2004. NetNames was also selected by Superbrands in its 2006/7 Top 50 eBrand Leaders.

== See also ==
- Internet in the United Kingdom
