= Prentice Hall =

Publishing company (1913–2020)

- Status: Defunct
- Founded: October 13, 1913; 113 years ago
- Founder: Charles Gerstenberg; Richard Ettinger
- Defunct: May 2020; 6 years ago
- Successor: Simon & Schuster (trade titles); CSC (financial); Wolters Kluwer (legal); Pearson (higher education); Savvas Learning (K-12 education)
- Country of origin: United States
- Headquarters location: Hoboken, New Jersey, U.S.
- Publication types: Elementary and Secondary school textbooks; College textbooks; Loose-leaf information services; Professional books
- Official website: www.savvas.com

Prentice Hall was a major American educational publisher. It published print and digital content for the 6–12 and higher-education market. It was an independent company throughout the bulk of the twentieth century. In its last few years it was owned by, then absorbed into, Savvas Learning Company. In the Web era, it distributed its technical titles through the Safari Books Online e-reference service for some years.

== History ==
On October 13, 1913, law professor Charles Gerstenberg and his student Richard Ettinger founded Prentice Hall. Gerstenberg and Ettinger took their mothers' maiden names, Prentice and Hall, to name their new company. At the time the name was usually styled as Prentice-Hall (as seen for example on many title pages), per an orthographic norm for coordinate elements within such compounds (compare also McGraw-Hill with later styling as McGraw Hill). Prentice-Hall became known as a publisher of trade books by authors such as Norman Vincent Peale; elementary, secondary, and college textbooks; loose-leaf information services; and professional books. Prentice-Hall acquired the training provider Deltak in 1979.

Prentice-Hall was acquired by Gulf+Western in 1984, and became part of that company's publishing division Simon & Schuster. S&S sold several Prentice-Hall subsidiaries: Deltak and Resource Systems were sold to National Education Center. Reston Publishing was closed.

In 1989, Prentice Hall Information Services was sold to Macmillan Inc. In 1990, Prentice Hall Press, a trade book publisher, was moved to Simon & Schuster Trade and Prentice Hall's reference & travel was moved to Simon & Schuster's mass market unit. Publication of trade books ended in 1991. In 1994, Gulf+Western successor Paramount was sold to Viacom. Prentice Hall Legal & Financial Services was sold to CSC and CDB Infotek. Wolters Kluwer acquired Prentice Hall Law & Business. Simon & Schuster's educational division, including Prentice Hall, was sold to Pearson plc by G+W successor Viacom in 1998. Subsequently, Pearson absorbed Prentice Hall's higher education and technical reference titles into Pearson Education. Pearson sold its K-12 educational publishing in the United States in 2019; the division was renamed Savvas Learning. K-12 and school titles of Prentice Hall were absorbed into Savvas Learning along with Prentice Hall web domains which redirected to Savvas Learning homepage and the trademarks for Prentice Hall were transferred to Savvas Learning Company.

== Notable titles ==
Prentice Hall is the publisher of Magruder's American Government as well as Biology by Ken Miller and Joe Levine, and Sociology and Society: The Basics by John Macionis. Their artificial intelligence series includes Artificial Intelligence: A Modern Approach by Stuart J. Russell and Peter Norvig and ANSI Common Lisp by Paul Graham. They also published the well-known computer programming book The C Programming Language by Brian Kernighan and Dennis Ritchie and Operating Systems: Design and Implementation by Andrew S. Tanenbaum. Winthrop Publishers, a Cambridge, Massachusetts–based subsidiary of Prentice Hall, published a series of books on programming beginning in the mid-1970s that was edited by Richard W. Conway. Other titles include Dennis Nolan's Big Pig (1976), Monster Bubbles: A Counting Book (1976), Alphabrutes (1977), Wizard McBean and his Flying Machine (1977), Witch Bazooza (1979), Llama Beans (1979, with author Charles Keller), and The Joy of Chickens (1981).

== In "personal computer" history ==
A Prentice Hall subsidiary, Reston Publishing, was in the foreground of technical-book publishing when microcomputers were first becoming available. It was still unclear who would be buying and using "personal computers", and the scarcity of useful software and instruction created a publishing market niche whose target audience yet had to be defined. In the spirit of the pioneers who made PCs possible, Reston Publishing's editors addressed non-technical users with the reassuring, and mildly experimental, Computer Anatomy for Beginners by Marlin Ouverson of People's Computer Company. They followed with a collection of books that was generally by and for programmers, building a stalwart list of titles relied on by many in the first generation of microcomputers users.

== See also ==
- Prentice Hall International Series in Computer Science
