= Marius Pope =

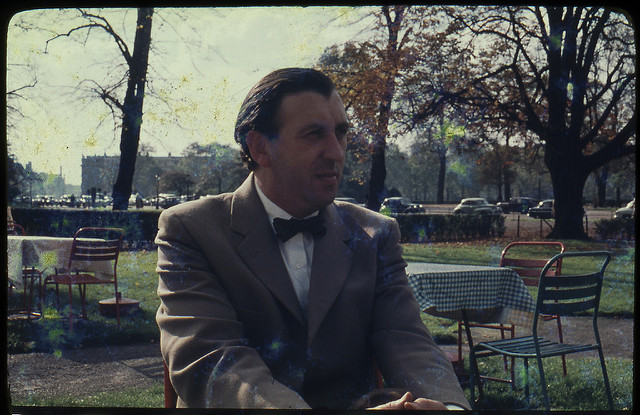
- Born: Maurice Pope; 31 December 1920; Amersfoort, Mpumalanga
- Died: 9 December 2009 (aged 88); Tunbridge Wells, Kent, England
- Spouse: Anne Patricia Collette Odile (m. 1959)
- Children: 4; including Ivan Pope

Marius Pope (31 December 1920 – 9 December 2009) was a journalist and ideas man who worked with Lord Beaverbrook, Charles Wintour and others to help invent the modern post-war newspaper.

== Life and career ==
Pope was born in Amersfoort, South Africa, where his parents, Lithuanian Jewish immigrants, were running a hotel. They returned to Johannesburg where they ran a piano shop, the Nugget Piano Salon. Pope attended a grammar school. After the outbreak of war he enlisted in the South African Defence Force in as a bandsman. After serving in East Africa, Abyssinia and the Middle East he was discharged as medically unfit in October 1943.

After working for the Labour Bulletin in Pretoria, Pope moved to London in 1947 and worked for Reuters in Fleet Street until 1949 when he moved for the first time to the Evening Standard.

In 1949 he wrote a pamphlet for The Bureau of Current Affairs called What's In The News?, asking ‘Do we tend to believe everything we read in print?'. In August 1949 he joined the London Evening Standard as Assistant Features Editor for eighteen pounds a week at, under the editor, Percy Elland. His classical music reviews earned him a permanent place on the features desk. He became Assistant Features Editor 'changing the look of the features pages and dominating the morning conferences, voice rising, arms waving, ideas bouncing from the walls'.

In 1954 Pope wrote to Hugh Cudlipp at the Mirror and in December that year he moved to work on Cudlipp's new women's newspaper. By the end of 1955 he was back working in the Features department at the Evening Standard where he first worked with Charles Wintour with whom he was to form a lifelong friendship. He was promoted to Features Editor.

In 1958 he married Patricia Pirard, a French national who lived in London.

In January 1958 he moved to become Associate Features Editor at the Daily Mail and by the end of the year he was Features Editor.

In July 1960 Pope was sacked by the new Editor of the Daily Mail, William Hardcastle and following a job offer from Max Corre, the editor-in-chief of Paris Presse, he went to work in Paris to bring the British sense of tabloid style to a floundering French newspaper. While in Paris he introduced Christian Millau to Henri Gault, a partnership that culminated in nouvelle cuisine and Le Nouveau Guide Gault-Millau.

In September 1961 his son, Ivan was born and in early 1962 Pope returned to London. He turned to Lord Beaverbrook who offered him a post back on the Evening Standard where Charles Wintour was now the Editor. Pope remained at the Standard for the rest of his career, working in various roles as a Features Editor and as the creator of key promotional events. another son, Patrick (the music photographer, Pat Pope) was born in 1966.

Following an aneurysm in 1983 Pope retired to Tunbridge Wells where he lived until his death in 2009.
