= Corporation Service Company =

American company

CSC®
- Type: Private Its parent company is listed on NYSE:- WMB
- Industry: Registered agent, corporate governance, corporate compliance, domain name and intellectual property management
- Founded: January 1, 1899; 127 years ago
- Headquarters: Wilmington, Delaware, U.S.
- Products: Corporate services; matter management; entity management; business licenses; Uniform Commercial Code searching and filing; lien portfolio management; electronic document recording; domain management
- Number of employees: 2,500+
- Parent: WMB Holdings, Inc.
- Website: cscglobal.com

CSC is a US company founded on January 1, 1899, that provides corporate, legal, and tax services. It is headquartered in Wilmington, Delaware, and has offices in the United States, Canada, Europe, and the Asia-Pacific region. It specializes in business formation, corporate domain management, and providing corporate tax software. As of 2022, CSC is the largest corporate domain registrar in the world.

== History ==
Corporation Service Company (CSC) was founded in 1899 by Christopher L. Ward and Otho Nowland, who was then the president of Equitable Guarantee & Trust Company. Using an initial investment from Nowland, Ward, and their associate Willard Jackson, they established The Delaware Incorporators’ Trust Company. A similar company was formed separately by Josiah P. Marvel, an attorney and then-leader of the American Bar Association, The Delaware Bar Association, and the Delaware State Chamber of Commerce.

In 1920, Ward and Marvel merged their respective companies to form the Corporation Service Company. Through the 1970s, CSC exclusively served Delaware business entities. WMB Holdings is the parent company of CSC.

CSC's Corporate Domains division provides services to various corporations, including Apple Inc., Alphabet Inc., Amazon, Twitter, Starbucks, Lego, Sony, Disney, Ford, BMW, Toyota, Vodafone.

The company raised capital through the sale of its subsidiary company, the Delaware Charter Guarantee & Trust Company, which it had acquired in 1977. During the September 11 attacks, the company had offices on the 87th floor of the World Trade Center's South Tower. All 60 employees present at the time of the attacks managed to evacuate the tower before the second plane struck. In 2017, CSC opened its new headquarters in Wilmington, Delaware and rebranded from "Corporation Service Company" to "CSC."

== Leadership ==
Bruce R. Winn began serving as CSC’s president in 1997 and its chief executive officer in 1998. In 2010, CSC announced the election of Rodman Ward III as its president and chief executive officer. Ward previously served as a board member for 15 years and is a fourth-generation descendant of one of the company’s founders, Christopher Ward. Ward also sits on the Delaware Prosperity Partnership.

== Acquisitions ==
In 1990, CSC acquired Florida-based Corporate Information Services. Between 1989 and 1998, CSC expanded through the acquisitions of nine other service providers, including Prentice Hall Legal & Financial Services in 1995, and Entity Service Group, LLC in 1998.

In 2003, CSC acquired LexisNexis Document Solutions to supplement its Uniform Commercial Code (UCC), secured lending, and motor vehicle services. Between 2005 and 2007, CSC acquired eBrandSecure, the corporate services division of Register.com, and NameProtect. In 2011, CSC acquired MLM Information Services, a tax management services provider. In 2012, CSC purchased Ingeo Systems, Inc., a provider of electronic real estate document recording (eRecording) services.

In 2013, CSC acquired the corporate domain name and online brand services division of Melbourne IT. The unit operates under a new name, CSC Digital Brand Services, and offers domain name management, trademark searching, phishing protection, SSL certificates, DNS services, and gTLD services.

In 2014, CSC announced that it had acquired IP Mirror, a Singapore-based provider of corporate domain name registration and online brand protection services. The acquisition of IP Mirror grew CSC Digital Brand Services’ ability to provide service in the Asia-Pacific region.

CSC acquired several companies in 2015, including Koehler Group. Koehler Group is a Hong Kong-headquartered provider of incorporation, tax, accounting, and trade support services. CSC currently has offices located throughout North America, Europe, and the Asia-Pacific region.

CSC also made acquisitions in 2016, including London-based online brand protection provider NetNames. This acquisition included Ascio Technologies, which was later sold to Tucows in 2019.

In March 2022, CSC offered to buy Dutch-based rival Intertrust Group for $2 billion. The acquisition completed in November that year.
