= Ivan Pope =

British writer and technologist

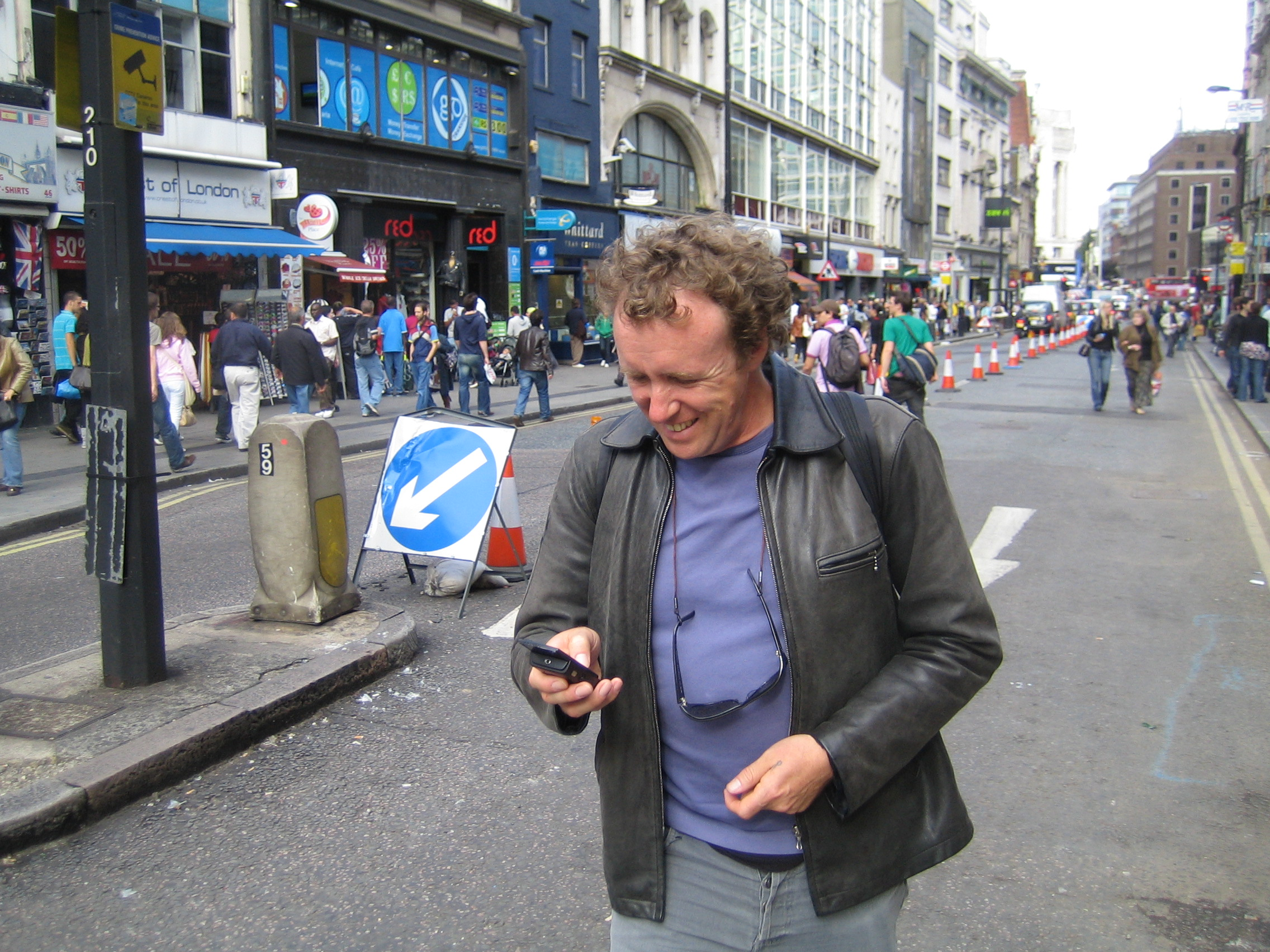
- Ivan Pope on Oxford Street, London in 2008
- Born: 1961 (age 64–65)
- Occupation: Technologist
- Years active: 1990s–present
- Father: Marius Pope
- Relatives: Pat Pope (brother)
- Website: https://www.ivanpope.com/

Ivan Pope (born 1961) is a British technologist involved in a number of early internet developments in the UK and internationally. He is credited with coining the term cybercafe at London's Institute of Contemporary Arts. Pope was a founder of two of the first online magazines: The World Wide Web Newsletter and later .net magazine in the UK. In 1994, he founded Webmedia to professionalise the process of website design and development. In 1995, he was involved with the creation of the domain name management industry and the company NetNames. Pope is now a writer and artist living in the Creuse, France.

== Biography ==
Pope was born in 1961, the son of Patricia Pirard, a French national, and Marius Pope, a south-African-born journalist of Lithuanian Jewish descent. His younger brother is the photographer Pat Pope.

== Work ==
=== 3W and internet magazines ===
The World Wide Web Newsletter office, Hackney

After graduating from Goldsmiths College with a BA in Fine Art in 1990, Pope worked as an artist with Loophole Cinema for five years. The World Wide Web Newsletter (later 3W magazine) was created by Pope at the Goldsmiths College Computer Centre early in 1993. The magazine was conceived as a general information source to promote internet use. Its name was taken from the World Wide Web project of Tim Berners-Lee, and the first issue was published in late 1993, reporting at the time that "there are under 100 web servers in the world".

After the launch of 3W magazine, Pope left Goldsmiths College to pursue web development full-time. In 1994 3W magazine had a stand at the inaugural London Internet World exhibition. He was hired by Time Out magazine in London to provide consultancy on its early web development initiatives.

Later that year, Pope joined Future Publishing to work on the launch of .net, the first consumer internet magazine. Based in Future Publishing's Bath offices, he served as Assistant Editor and contributed extensively to the magazine's content during its first year of publication.

=== Cybercafe ===
In March 1994, Pope was invited to curate an internet component for an arts symposium at the Institute of Contemporary Arts in London. Inspired by reports of a cafe in the United States that offered bulletin board access, he coined the term cybercafe for a weekend event held in the ICA theatre as part of the exhibition "Towards the Aesthetics of the Future". The event featured Apple Macs on cafe-style tables to provide public access to the internet. Pope is credited with originating the concept of an internet cafe, although earlier dial-up cafés had existed.

Later in 1994, Pope and internet artist Heath Bunting planned to open London's first cybercafe, but were preempted by Cyberia.

Together with Steve Bowbrick, Pope founded Webmedia, an early web development company whose first offices were located in the basement of Cyberia. Webmedia aimed to professionalise the design and development of websites, a structured approach that was largely absent at the time. The company expanded rapidly over the next two years, securing early web accounts from clients such as Lloyds Bank and Lufthansa.

=== Netnames and Nominet ===
While managing Webmedia and working within the emerging web industry, Pope identified a need for organised domain name registration services. In 1995, he founded NetNames, a company established to manage global domain name registrations for companies and individuals. In 1996, Pope publicly objected to the manner in which Nominet began registering UK domain names for an annual fee, expressing concern over the lack of regulation and oversight.

In 1997, Pope separated NetNames from Webmedia. In 2000, he sold NetNames to Netbenefit NBT, then a UK company listed on the London Stock Exchange. Following this acquisition, Pope joined Netbenefit's board and briefly served as its chair before leaving the company in 2001.

By the late 1990s, Pope had played a significant role in the formation of Nominet UK, the not-for-profit organisation responsible for managing the .uk domain name namespace.

=== Start-ups ===
In 2006, Pope founded Snipperoo, a widget management company, and became a prominent blogger and commentator on web widgets. He spoke at industry events including WidgetsLive! and Widgetcon. On 6 December 2007, he created Widgetygoodness, Europe's first conference dedicated to web widgets, held in Brighton.

Pop was also the founder of several other start-ups, including Fabrivan, Thingmakers and Shapie Me.

== Bibliography ==
- Internet UK. Prentice Hall, 1995. ISBN 9780131909502
- The First Days of the Internet. Self-published. 2021.

== See also ==
- Computer Underground Digest
- Internet in the United Kingdom
