= Cambridge Distributed Computing System =

- Developer: Computer Laboratory, University of Cambridge
- Working state: Historic
- Platforms: Computer Automation LSI4, Motorola 68000
- Influenced: Plan 9 from Bell Labs

The Cambridge Distributed Computing System is an early discontinued distributed operating system, developed in the 1980s at Cambridge University. It grew out of the Cambridge Ring local area network, which it used to interconnect computers.

The Cambridge system connected terminals to "processor banks". At login, a user would request from the bank a machine with a given architecture and amount of memory. The system then assigned to the user a machine that served, for the duration of the login session, as their "personal" computer. The machines in the processor bank ran the TRIPOS operating system. Additional special-purpose servers provided file and other services. At its height, the Cambridge system consisted of some 90 machines.
