= Sylvia Wilbur =

British computer scientist who worked on the early ARPANET

Sylvia B. Wilbur (born 1938) was a British computer scientist who helped develop the ARPANET, was one of the first to exchange email in Britain, and became a leading researcher on computer-supported cooperative work.

== Early life and education ==
Wilbur was born in Romford, Essex, the older of the two daughters of a working-class dockworking family. She attended a grammar school, but left at age 17 to help support her family rather than continuing on to university. She worked as a clerk and typist in East London, and three years later married another clerk. She stopped work to have two children, but after her children were old enough to be cared for by her mother, in approximately 1964, she took another position as a typist at Barking College, later part of the University of East London. Her work there involved typing up student computer programming exercises in the ALGOL programming language onto punched tape, and she soon began to learn computer programming herself. Motivated by this experience, she entered a distance learning program at the Open University, where she completed a bachelor's degree in mathematics in 1974.

Later, she completed a master's degree at the University of Kent.

== Early career and Internet programming ==
While completing her degree Wilbur moved from being a typist at the University of East London to being a computer operator, and began learning a second programming language, COBOL. Just before completing her degree she moved to a research position at University College London, working as a computer programmer for Peter T. Kirstein in the department of statistics and computer science there. Kirstein was in charge of Britain's part of the ARPANET project, and Wilbur's work for him involved programming a PDP-9 computer used as the local node for the network. She also worked as a liaison and technical assistant for British network users more generally who needed to connect to the network, and became "probably one of the first people in this country ever to send an email, back in 1974".

In approximately 1978, Wilbur remarried. Her husband was also affiliated with the same department at University College London, and had been supervising some of her work there, so to preserve her independence she left her position. After working for the examinations board for a year she became a lecturer at the University of East London. Five years later, in approximately 1983, she moved again to Queen Mary College, in part because of the lack of time to work on research in East London.

== Later career and computer-supported cooperative work ==
In around 1986, Wilbur began performing research as project manager for a government-sponsored project in computer-supported cooperative work. Her early work in the area involved asynchronous communication media (like email, where messages are sent and received at different times) but in later projects she began using synchronized media for teleconferencing.

Wilbur was also an organizer of "Women Into Computing" workshops at Queen Mary, together with another organizer, Hilary Buxton, in the mid to late 1980s. These workshops brought local schoolgirls into Queen Mary College in an attempt to recruit them into the computing programme. Later, she integrated her work on teleconferencing into these workshops, bringing the workshops into the schools rather than bringing the students from the schools to the college.

== Selected publications ==
- O'Conaill, Brid; Whittaker, Steve; Wilbur, Sylvia (December 1993), "Conversations over Video Conferences: An Evaluation of the Spoken Aspects of Video-mediated Communication", Human-Computer Interaction, 8 (4): 389–428, doi:10.1207/s15327051hci0804_4, S2CID 957740
- Finn, Kathleen E.; Sellen, Abigail J.; Wilbur, Sylvia B., eds. (1997), Video-Mediated Communication, Hillsdale, NJ, USA: L. Erlbaum Associates, ISBN 0805822887
- Slater, Mel; Wilbur, Sylvia (December 1997), "A Framework for Immersive Virtual Environments (FIVE): Speculations on the Role of Presence in Virtual Environments", Presence: Teleoperators and Virtual Environments, 6 (6): 603–616, doi:10.1162/pres.1997.6.6.603, S2CID 9437981

== See also ==
- Adrian V. Stokes
- History of the Internet
- Internet in the United Kingdom § History
- Karen Banks – British computer networking pioneer
- List of Internet pioneers
- Nicola Pellow – British information scientist who worked on the early World Wide Web
