= Greg Brown (businessman) =

American businessman

Gregory Q. Brown
- Born: 1960 (age 65–66); New Brunswick, New Jersey, U.S.
- Education: Rutgers University
- Title: Chairman and CEO (Motorola Solutions) since 2008

Gregory Q. Brown (born 1960) is an American businessman. He has been chairman and chief executive officer of Motorola Solutions since 2008.

== Education ==
Brown graduated from Rutgers University, where he received a Bachelor of Science in economics in 1982. He graduated from Highland Park High School in New Jersey.

== Career ==
After graduating from Rutgers with a degree in economics, Brown took a position with AT&T in 1982. He led a team that won a contract to sell over 10,000 computers to General Motors and Electronic Data Systems. He eventually left AT&T for Ameritech.

In 1996, Brown was appointed as president of Ameritech Custom Business Services, a position he held until 1999. He was also named president of Ameritech New Media Inc. from September 1996 to February 1999. In these roles he was responsible for all consumer cable TV operations, programming, and content relationships. The Ameritech CEO, Dick Notebaert, chose Brown to build a cable business inside Ameritech. That business was sold to Wide Open West LLC in 2001 for $1 billion (estimated).

Brown left Ameritech for the company Micromuse. He was the Chairman and CEO for the San Francisco-based network management software company (acquired by IBM) for four years until his resignation in December 2002 Under his leadership, the company’s annual revenue grew from $28 million to over $200 million. Brown left Micromuse to join Motorola.

=== Motorola and Motorola Solutions ===
Brown is chairman and chief executive officer of Motorola Solutions, which builds and connects safety and security technologies that help protect people, property and places, including communications, video security and the command center. He is the company’s longest-serving CEO, after the founder Paul Galvin and his son Bob. An analyst at Northcoast Research noted Brown "has been a success on many levels. (Motorola Solutions) stock has blossomed, and the company has been transformed completely" during his tenure as CEO.

Brown joined Motorola in January 2003 as head of the communications, government, and industrial solutions sector. In this role, he led the acquisition of Symbol Technologies for $3.9 billion. In 2007 he was promoted to chief operating officer and, in 2008, was named CEO. In 2011 he was named Chairman of the Board.

In March 2008, with the company losing money, Brown announced that Motorola would split in two. Motorola became Motorola Mobility (the cellphone side of the company), and Motorola Solutions. Brown continued to run the new Motorola Solutions, which began trading on the New York Stock Exchange in 2011, and under his leadership has made 60 acquisitions. The company’s three business areas are land-mobile-radio communications (LMR), video security and the command center.

=== Boards and other work ===
Brown served on President George W. Bush’s National Security Telecommunications Advisory Committee (NSTAC). The NSTAC is a group of chief executives representing various different service providers including communications and network services as well as finance, aerospace and IT companies.

Brown also served on President Obama’s Management Advisory Board. The PMAB advises the President on how to implement best business practices on matters related to Federal Government management and operation, focusing on productivity, the application of technology, and customer service.

Brown is a member of the Council on Foreign Relations and The Business Council.

== Awards ==
- Honorary Doctor of Humane Letters from Rutgers University

== Personal life ==
Brown, the youngest of five, grew up in North Brunswick, New Jersey. Brown and his wife, Anna, have two children.
