= MidMAN =

MidMAN was one of the regional networks that comprise JANET, providing connectivity to schools, colleges and universities in the West Midlands area of England. The provision of services was managed by the West Midlands Regional Networking Company Ltd, whose network is operated by Synetrix and Telewest. Support was provided to connected institutions by the JISC Regional Support Centre West Midlands which is based at the University of Wolverhampton.

In 2008 MidMAN was rebranded to "JANET West Midlands" and management of the network was transferred to the JANET NOC in London.

== See also ==
- JANET
