= Journal of Behavioral Finance =

Journal focused on behavioral finance

- Discipline: Behavioral finance
- Language: English

Publication details
- Former name(s): The Journal of Psychology and Financial Markets
- History: 2000-present
- Publisher: Routledge on behalf of The Institute of Behavioral Finance (United States)
- Frequency: Quarterly
- Impact factor: 1.798 (2021)

Standard abbreviations
- ISO 4: J. Behav. Finance

Indexing
- ISSN: 1542-7560 (print); 1542-7579 (web)
- LCCN: 2002215600
- OCLC no.: 51166000

Links
- Journal homepage; Online access; Online archive

The Journal of Behavioral Finance is a quarterly peer-reviewed academic journal that covers research related to the field of behavioral finance. It was established in 2000 as The Journal of Psychology and Financial Markets. The founding Board of Editors were Brian Bruce, David Dreman, Paul Slovic, Nobel Laureate Vernon Smith and Arnold Wood. The editor-in-chief was Gunduz Caginalp (2000-2005), Brian Bruce (Hillcrest Asset Management) is the current editor. Taylor and Francis is the journal's publisher (2023).

== Abstracting and indexing ==
The journal is abstracted and indexed in:

- EBSCOhost Online Research Databases
- EconLit
- Gale Cengage: Business ASAP
- Social Sciences Citation Index
- Current Contents/Social & Behavioral Science
- PsycINFO/Psychological Abstracts
- LexisNexis
- ProQuest ABI/Inform

According to the Journal Citation Reports, the journal has a 2022 impact factor of 1.8. In a 2010 ranking it was 71st out of 76 journals in the category "Business, Finance", and 256th out of 305 journals in the category "Economics". The Journal is ranked number 30 out of 80 established finance program journals, as per the Author Affiliation Index methodology, which is an affiliation based network approach to journal rankings. The rankings are published in the Journal of Corporate Finance. It has a 7% acceptance rate. The Australian Business School Deans list it as a selective A ranked journal.

== See also ==
- Prospect theory
