= Gautam Mitra =

- Born: 1 January 1941 (age 85)
- Died: 10 February 2024; Kolkata, India
- Education: Jadavpur University (B.E); Queen Mary College (MSc); Institute of Computer Science (PhD)
- Spouse: Dhira Mitra
- Children: 2 [Leela Mitra and Chanakya Mitra]

Gautam Mitra was a research scientist in the field of Operational Research in general and computational optimization and modelling in particular.

In 2004 he was awarded the title of ‘distinguished professor’ by Brunel University in recognition of his contributions in the domain of computational optimization, risk analytics and modelling. He headed the Mathematics Department (1990-2001) and subsequently founded the Center for the Analysis of Risk and Optimization Modelling Application (CARISMA). He was an emeritus Professor of Brunel University and a visiting professor of University College London. He published five books and over hundred and fifty research articles.

Professor Mitra was the founder and CEO of OptiRisk Systems where he directed research and actively pursued the development of the company in the domain of optimization and financial analytics. In OptiRisk, he developed and led a research group in his areas of specialization with talented researchers from UK, India, Europe, USA, and Brazil. Professor Mitra was also the founder and chairman of the sister company UNICOM Seminars. OptiRisk Systems and UNICOM Seminars also have subsidiaries in India. In India and Southeast Asia both the companies are going through a period of organic growth.

== Early life and education ==
Until the age of 14, Mitra was taught by his mother, Meera Rani Mitra, who was proficient in mathematics.

In 1956, Mitra enrolled in the intermediate science degree at Presidency University, Kolkata. He then graduated with an electrical engineering degree from Jadavpur University.

In 1962, he enrolled at Queen Mary University of London for an MPhil in Electrical Engineering, and later joined the newly formed Institute of Computer Science as a temporary programmer and then a research fellow gaining a PhD in 1968.

== Career ==
After gaining his PhD Gautam worked under Martin Beale, renowned optimisation specialist and director of Scientific Control Systems, and became a key member of the team developing optimisation solvers. After four more years in industry he joined Brunel University London as a lecturer. Subsequently, he rose to be the Head of Department of Mathematics. He founded CARISMA, a research centre in risk analysis and optimisation. Under his leadership the Mathematics department flourished, being rated second best research department in the London area; he retired in 2009.

== Awards and honours ==
- Rector's Gold Medal of Best Graduating student Jadavpur University (1962)
- Distinguished Professor Brunel University (2004)
- Fellow of British Computer Society
- Fellow of Institute of Mathematics and its Applications
- Fellow of Royal Society of Arts
- Patron of the Royal Institution

== Books ==
Authored:

- Theory and Application of Mathematical Programming, Academic Press, December 1976.
- (with N Koutsoukis) Decision Modelling and Information Systems: The Information Value Chain, INFORMS Operations Research/ Computer Science Interfaces Series, publishers Kluwer Press, G Mitra, N Koutsoukis, (2003).

Edited:

- Computer Assisted Decision Making: expert systems, decision analysis, mathematical programming. Published by North Holland in August 1986 in their AI catalogue.
- Mathematical Models for Decision Support, Editor G. Mitra, in NATO Advanced Study Institute Series, 1988, by Springer Verlag.
- Annals of Operations Research, Vol.43, Applied Mathematical Programming and Modelling: APMOD91, Edited by G. Mitra and I. Maros, Baltzer AG Science Publishers, Switzerland, 1993.
- Annals of Operations Research, Vol.58, Applied Mathematical Programming and Modelling: APMOD93, Edited by G. Mitra and I. Maros, Baltzer AG Science Publishers, Switzerland, 1995.
- Annals of Operations Research, Vol.75, Applied Mathematical Programming and Modelling: APMOD95, Edited by G. Mitra, I. Maros and A. Sciomachen, Baltzer AG Science Publishers, Switzerland, 1997.
- Annals of Operations Research, Applied Mathematical Programming and Modelling: APMOD98, Edited by G. Mitra, I. Maros and H. Vladimirou, Baltzer AG Science Publishers, Switzerland, 2000 (now Kluwer Press)
- Annals of Operations Research, Applied Mathematical Programming and Modelling: APMOD2000, Edited by G. Mitra and I. Maros, Baltzer AG Science Publishers, Switzerland, 2002, (Now Kluwer Press)
