= Computer Underground Digest =

Online newsletter

- Editor: Jim Thomas
- News Editor: Gordon Meyer
- Categories: Online magazine
- Frequency: Weekly
- First issue: March 28, 1990
- Final issue Number: March 12, 2000; Volume 12, Issue 01
- Country: USA
- Language: English
- Website: computer-underground-digest.org

The Computer Underground Digest (CuD) was a weekly online newsletter on early Internet cultural, social, and legal issues published by Gordon Meyer and Jim Thomas from March 1990 to March 2000.

== History ==
Meyer and Thomas were Criminal Justice professors at Northern Illinois University, and intended the newsletter to cover topical social and legal issues generated during the rise of the telecommunications and the Internet. It existed primarily as an email mailing list and on USENET, though its archives were later provided on a website. The newsletter came to prominence when it published legal commentary and updates concerning the "hacker crackdowns" and federal indictments of Leonard Rose and Craig Neidorf of Phrack.

The CuD published commentary from its membership on subjects including the legal and social implications of the growing Internet (and later the web), book reviews of topical publications, and many off-topic postings by its readership. Overtaken by the growth of online forums on the web, it ceased publication in March, 2000.

== See also ==
- Phrack
- Cult of the Dead Cow
