= Pat Pope =

British photographer

- Born: 1966
- Alma mater: The Skinners' School
- Occupation: Photographer
- Relatives: Ivan Pope
- Website: www.patpope.com

Patrick Pope (born 1966) is a British photographer, who specialises in taking pictures of musicians. As a touring photographer, Pope has travelled with several notable acts.

== Early life ==
Pope was born in 1966, to Patricia, née Pirard, and the journalist Marius Pope. He was raised in Tunbridge Wells and attended The Skinners' School. His older brother is the technologist Ivan Pope.

== Career ==
He has toured with Radiohead and was commissioned by David Bowie. His work is used in the packaging of the albums Suede (1993), the debut by the band of the same name, and The Fat of the Land (1997) by The Prodigy. His 2001 photograph of Dido, taken in Madrid, is in the collection of the United Kingdom's National Portrait Gallery.

=== Garbage controversy ===
In 2015, photographer Pope posted an open letter to the band Garbage on his Facebook page, alleging that the band's management had approached him for permission to incorporate some of his images without fee, apart from appropriate credit.

Pope felt that this was hypocritical on Garbage's part, and declined the use of the images. After the post went viral, and attracted media attention, Manson posted a response to Pope via the band's own Facebook page, stating that they had decided to ask photographers for the use of their images and respect any declined requests.

Pope decided to draw a line under the debate that his open letter has started, and explain the reasons for his public refusal. Pope explained that he strongly felt that photography was being devalued by companies asking for work with recompense, or not even bothering gaining permission (Pope only discovered one of his images had been used in the booklet for the band's greatest hits album Absolute Garbage after purchasing a copy and opening the package).

== Personal life ==
In 2018 Pope was affected by a stroke.
