= Intertrust Group =

Dutch corporate management service company

- Company type: Subsidiary
- Industry: Professional services
- Founded: 1952; 74 years ago
- Headquarters: Amsterdam, Netherlands
- Number of locations: 41
- Key people: Shankar Iyer (CEO), Rogier van Wijk (CFO), Hélène Vletter-van Dort (Chairperson Supervisory Board)
- Revenue: €485.2 million (2017)
- Net income: €139.5 million (2017)
- Number of employees: 3,500
- Parent: Corporation Service Company
- Website: intertrustgroup.com

Intertrust (formerly Intertrust N.V.) is an international trust and corporate management company based in Amsterdam, Netherlands. In November 2022, it was acquired by Corporation Service Company. The company is best known for its fiduciary services, which includes tax, trust, business management and outsourcing processes. It is the largest trust office in the Netherlands.

Intertrust's origins date back to the incorporation of NV Trust Corporation Pierson, Heldring & Pierson in 1952. Shankar Iyer has been the company's acting chief executive officer since December 2020.

Intertrust has locations in North America, South America, Europe, Asia and the Middle East, but most of its revenue stems from a small number of tax havens. The company is listed on Euronext Amsterdam Stock Exchange. As of 2015 Intertrust's clients include 6 out of the top 10 of the Fortune Global 500, as well as thirty out of the world's fifty largest private equity funds. It does not disclose which companies these are.

== History ==
In 1952, NV Trust Corporation Pierson, Heldring & Pierson was incorporated in Curaçao by Pierson, Heldring & Pierson. In 1975, AMRO Bank acquired Pierson, Heldring & Pierson and ABN Bank acquired Mees & Hope Bankers. After the merger of ABN Bank and AMRO bank into ABN AMRO in 1991, Pierson, Heldring & Pierson and Mees & Hope Bank were merged into MeesPierson in 1993. The trust and corporate management services activities were branded as MeesPierson Trust.

In 1997, MeesPierson was acquired by Fortis. In 2002, MeesPierson acquired Holland Intertrust Corporation and rebranded as MeesPierson Intertrust. The company adopted its owner's name in 2006 and rebranded as Fortis Intertrust.

In June 2009, Fortis Intertrust was rebranded as Intertrust. It was sold to Dutch investor, Rob Thielen's, Waterland Private Equity Investments for a reported price of either €210 million or €250 million.

In December 2012, Blackstone Group announced that it would acquire Intertrust from Waterland Private Equity Investments, which was completed in April 2013. Reports stated that Blackstone paid €675 million for Intertrust.

Intertrust held its initial public offering in September 2015 in Amsterdam, expecting to raise €475 million. In October 2015, shares of Intertrust N.V. started trading on the Euronext Amsterdam Stock Exchange at an issue price of €15.50 per share. In total, Intertrust's IPO raised about €486 million. The company's profits decreased from €6.3 million in 2014 to €2.6 million in 2015 due to increased competition on the Cayman Islands.

In November 2022, the US-based Corporation Service Company (CSC) completed its acquisition of Intertrust for $2 billion.

=== Acquisitions ===
In June 2013, Intertrust announced that it would acquire ATC for $397 million, which was completed in December 2013. In June 2015, Intertrust announced that it would acquire CorpNordic, which was finalised in August 2015. In 2016, the company announced that it would acquire Elian for $625 million in cash, shares and debt.

In June 2019, Intertrust announced the acquisition of technology solutions provider Viteos.

== Activities ==
Intertrust is headquartered in Amsterdam, Netherlands. The company's operational offices are in the Netherlands, Luxembourg, the Cayman Islands, Jersey and Guernsey. It has other locations in North America, South America, Europe, Asia and the Middle East, totaling 41 offices in 30 countries. The company manages the administration of some 40,000 "entities", nominally housed at its Dutch offices.
