= Micromuse =

Former American software company

Micromuse Inc.
- Type: Public
- Traded as: Nasdaq: MUSE
- Industry: Software
- Founded: 1989
- Founder: Christopher Dawes; Phil Tee
- Defunct: 2006; 20 years ago
- Fate: Acquired by IBM
- Headquarters: San Francisco
- Key people: Stephen Allott (President until 2001); Greg Brown (CEO until 2002); Lloyd Carney (CEO from 2003)

Micromuse was a network management software company founded in London in 1989 and headquartered from 1997 in San Francisco.

Micromuse's valuation peaked at $7.8 billion in December 2000 (inflation adjusted to $15.2 billion in 2026), making it the most valuable organically-grown UK-origin software company in history. The company was later acquired by IBM in 2005.

== Products ==
The company's products include Netcool/OMNIbus, Netcool/Impact and Netcool/RAD (Realtime Active Dashboards) which would later become members of the Tivoli Software portfolio. Netcool/OMNIbus and Netcool/Impact continued as IBM products, keeping its original name whereas Netcool/RAD (and some other Micromuse products) were renamed Tivoli Business Service Manager (TBSM), not to be confused with an earlier IBM product named Tivoli Business Systems Manager.

== History ==
Micromuse was founded by Christopher Dawes and Angela Dawes (née Collinge), in London, in 1989.

Micromuse originated in London Chelsea and then moved to Putney Bridge Road in Wandsworth. Incorporated in 1989 as a hardware and software value added reseller, it became Micromuse plc.

Micromuse became a VAR of Sun Microsystems hardware and software (a “Sun VAR”) focused on telecom and finance customers. It became the UK distributor of Sun Net Manager while it also sold HP OpenView software and NetMetrix probes.

Michael Jackson (of Sage, Party Gaming and Elderstreet) was the angel investor and joined the Micromuse p.l.c. board.

In 1993, the company set up its Netcool network fault management software development team led by Martin Butterworth, Adam Kerrison and Mark Peach. Micromuse acquired Phil Tee's company OMNIbus Transport Technologies Ltd. The teams were integrated to form the Netcool/OMNIbus development team. By 1994, early Netcool customers were BT Dorking and BT Managed Network Services, BT Net and Goldman Sachs.

In September 1995, Stephen Allott joined as Commercial Director reporting to Chris Dawes, (Founder and chairman). Allott joined from McKinsey & Company following Sun Microsystems’ suggestion. At this point the company employed some 50 people in total of which 8 were in the Netcool team. Netcool was worth about $10 million at this point on 1995 revenues of $1 million. The VAR division employed 42 people with gross revenues of $13 million.

Allott was appointed as managing director by the Dawes family. He developed and executed the internet growth strategy for the company and the growth strategy for Netcool, selling the VAR division in 1997 to focus on Netcool. The company incorporated Micromuse Inc. as a US holding company with offices in San Francisco (HQ), New York and Dallas.

Allott, now SVP Finance, led the NASDAQ IPO process culminating in the listing on 14 February 1998.

In October 1998, the company announced that Allott, the Chief Financial Officer of the company, was named president and appointed a Director of the Company and that Christopher J. Dawes had resigned as a Director. Allott took over leadership.

In March 1999, Allott led the recruitment of Greg Brown who joined as chairman and CEO. From then, Allott as president, CFO and a main board director reported to Greg. Under their leadership, Micromuse achieved its peak valuation of $7.8 billion in December 2000 (inflation adjusted to $15.2 billion in 2026).

In 2001, Allott was appointed as a Venture Partner of Fidelity (London) and was appointed as chairman of Jacobs Rimell Ltd (London) and stepped down from all his positions at Micromuse.

In 2002, Greg Brown was replaced by Lloyd Carney.

In June 2002, Micromuse entered into an agreement to purchase rival firm RiverSoft for £43 million. RiverSoft was founded by Phil Tee after he left Micromuse in 1996.

In December 2002, the company chairman and chief executive officer Greg Brown announced his resignation, and his move to become executive vice president of Motorola. Brown had worked for Micromuse since 1999.

In July 2003, Lloyd Carney was named CEO and chairman of the board, replacing Mike Luetkemeyer who was the interim CEO.

In July 2005, Micromuse announced an agreement to acquire GuardedNet Inc, a computer security company based in Atlanta, for $16.2 million in cash.

Dawes had died when his McLaren F1 car crashed in Essex, in 1999.

In December 2005, IBM entered into an agreement to acquire Micromuse for approximately $865 million in cash.

== Record Valuation ==
Micromuse is the most valuable organically grown UK-origin software company in history, achieving a peak valuation of $7.8 billion in late 2000. Adjusted for UK inflation this is $15.2 billion in 2026 according to the Bank of England. This is based upon a peak share value of $106.22 on 31 December 2000 with 73,760,749 shares. Forbes indicated a valuation of $5.4 billion in the second quarter of 2000.
