= Institute of Computer Science =

English educational institute

University of London Institute of Computer Science
- Active: 1950s–1974
- Location: 44–45 Gordon Square London, United Kingdom

The University of London Institute of Computer Science (ICS) was an Institute based in London in England. The institute was founded by the University of London to support and provide academic research, postgraduate teaching, computer services and network services. It was founded as the University of London Computer Unit at some point in the 1950s, changed its name to the Institute of Computer Science in the 1960s, and dissolved in 1974.

== History ==
The exact date of foundation remains to be established, but the Institute appears to have already existed by the 1950s. Richard Buckingham was Director, first of the Computer Unit and later of the Institute of Computer Science, from 1957 to 1973.

The name of Institute had been given by 1962, when John Buxton became one of its lecturers. It was dissolved in 1974 and its Director moved to Birkbeck College. Some of the material in this description of the institute is derived from a history of the School of Computer Science & Information System at that college.

== Teaching ==
The Master of Science (MSc) in Computer Science of the institute was one of the first courses in the subject. Barnett also ran informal courses, at the Institute and at the London College of Printing, to explain computer typesetting to officials of the trade unions concerned with the printing industry.

A number of distinguished software and hardware engineers and scientists taught and supervised the M.Sc. and Ph.D. degrees awarded by the institute (see Staff above). Prominent graduates of the Institute include – Michael Newman, Professor of Information Systems, Manchester Business School. Nick Fiddian, Professor and Head of Department of Computer Science, Cardiff University, and Gautam Mitra, OptiRisk Systems Ltd, Professor of Computational Optimisation, Brunel University.

== Computer Services ==
The Institute provided early mainframe computer services on an Atlas computer, as the University of London Atlas Computing Service. The Atlas Computer (Manchester) was an early transistor machine and only three ever existed. A number of pioneering programmes were developed on the ICS Atlas including the CPL1 Compiler, A General Fourier Synthesis Program, A Computer Technique for Optimizing the Sites and Heights of Transmission Line Towers and even an early work in computing for English Change Ringing. All of these are described in papers under Research above. When the Institute closed, services were taken over by the University of London Computer Centre (ULCC) although ULCC did initially run in parallel with the Atlas service.

== Networking ==
The Institute provided batch and interactive communications. The main services were the first UK Arpanet node and Remote Job Entry (RJE) to the IBM 360/195 at the Rutherford Laboratory in Oxfordshire. The Arpanet node was the first in Europe and is therefore the first place where what became the Internet was available in Europe. The RJE service using a Digital Equipment Corporation PDP-9 emulating an IBM 1130 (presumably a HASP workstation) was the first remote user of the 360/195,
