= University of London Computer Centre =

One of the first supercomputer centres in the United Kingdom

The University of London Computer Centre (ULCC) was founded in 1968, and was the first supercomputer facility established in London for the purpose of scientific and educational research by all of the colleges of the University of London.

== Facility ==
ULCC initially provided large-scale CDC-based facilities, then from 1982 to 1991 a national Cray vector supercomputing service, and more recently a six processor, 4Gb Convex C3860 supercomputer with a Convex C3200 front-end.

ULCC also became a major site for national and international network connections in the UK. It ran the Network Operations and Service Centre for the JANET Internet Protocol Service (JIPS), the largest of the JANET network centres, and various international links and relays on behalf of UKERNA.

Since the closure of its supercomputer service in the 1990s, ULCC has focused on providing IT services across the educational and public sector, as well as undertaking research work in fields such as digital preservation and e-learning.

In 2009, after 40 years, ULCC moved out of its premises at 20 Guilford Street, which were custom built in the 1960s to house some of the earliest supercomputers in the UK. It is now based within the central university at Senate House.

In 2015 ULCC became part of CoSector - University of London.

== See also ==
- Institute of Computer Science
