= JANET =

Academic computer network in the United Kingdom

Janet
- Predecessor: SERCnet
- Formation: 1 April 1984
- Type: National research and education network
- Headquarters: Harwell, Oxfordshire, United Kingdom
- Region served: UK
- Director (Jisc Technologies): Tim Kidd
- Website: www.jisc.ac.uk/janet
- Formerly called: Janet(UK); JANET

Janet is a high-speed network for the UK research and education community provided by Jisc, a not-for-profit company set up to provide computing support for education. It serves 18 million users and is the busiest National Research and Education Network in Europe by volume of data carried. Previously, Janet was a private, UK-government funded organisation, which provided the JANET computer network and related collaborative services to UK research and education.

All further- and higher-education organisations in the UK are connected to the Janet network, as are all the Research Councils; the majority of these sites are connected via 20 metropolitan area networks across the UK (though Janet refers to these as regions, emphasising that Janet connections are not just confined to a metropolitan area). The network also carries traffic between schools within the UK, although many of the schools' networks maintain their own general Internet connectivity. The name was originally a contraction of Joint Academic NETwork but it is now known as Janet in its own right.

The network is linked to other European and worldwide NRENs through GÉANT and peers extensively with other ISPs at Internet Exchange Points in the UK. Any other networks are reached via transit services from commercial ISPs using Janet's Peering Policy.

The Janet network is operated by Jisc Services Limited, part of Jisc. Janet is also responsible for the .ac.uk domain. On 1 December 2012, Janet and Jisc Collections joined to form Jisc Collections and Janet Limited, as subsidiary organisations to Jisc. In March 2015, Jisc Collections and Janet Limited was renamed to Jisc Services Limited. Jisc Services continues to operate under the brand name of Janet, with the same remit. Janet was previously known as the JNT Association, and prior to that, UKERNA (the United Kingdom Education and Research Networking Association).

== History ==
=== Early academic networks ===
Janet developed out of academic networks built in Britain since the late 1960s. Planning for the first regional network, South West Universities Computer Network (SWUCN), centred on Bristol began in 1967 and work started in 1969. A number of national computer facilities serving the Science Research Council (SRC) community developed in the early 1970s, each with their own star network (ULCC London, UMRCC Manchester, Rutherford Appleton Laboratory). Other regional networks followed in the mid-late 1970s around Edinburgh (RCOnet), London (METROnet), the Midlands (MIDnet), and Newcastle (NUMAC - the Northern Universities Multiple Access Computer) among others such as Yorkshire and the South East. These groups of institutions pooled resources to provide better computing facilities than could be afforded individually. The star networks developed into distributed computer networks but each was based on one manufacturer's standards and were mutually incompatible and overlapping.

=== JANET ===
In the early 1980s a standardisation and interconnection effort started, hosted on an expansion of the SERCnet X.25 research network. (Note: The Science Research Council (SRC) was renamed the Science and Engineering Research Council (SERC) in 1981 and the computer network was renamed accordingly.) The JANET effort was based on the Coloured Book protocols developed by the British academic community, which provided the first complete X.25 standard, and gave the UK "several years lead over other countries". The naming scheme, JANET NRS, established "UK" as the top-level domain. Later that year, the Internet's Domain Name System adopted British researchers' recommendation to use country code top-level domains. By then, the UK had a pre-existing national standard, which was retained as the .uk Internet country-code top level domain for the United Kingdom.

JANET went live on 1 April 1984, two years before the NSFNET initiated operations in the United States. It hosted about 50 sites with line speeds of 9.6 kbit/s. In the mid-80s the backbone was upgraded to 2 Mbit/s, with 64 kbit/s access links. JANET connected to NSFNET in 1989.

=== JIPS ===
Planning began in January 1991 for the JANET Internet Protocol Service (JIPS). It was set up as a pilot project in March 1991 to host Internet Protocol (IP) traffic on the existing network. Within eight months the IP traffic had exceeded the levels of X.25 traffic, and the IP support became official in November.

JANET became, primarily, a high-speed IP network. A further upgrade in the early 1990s took the backbone to 8 Mbit/s and the access links to 2 Mbit/s, making Janet the fastest X.25 network in the world at the time.

There had been some talk of moving Janet to OSI protocols in the 1990s, but changes in the networking world meant this never happened. The X.25 service was closed in August 1997.

=== SuperJanet ===
In order to address speed concerns, several hardware upgrades have been incorporated into the Janet system. In 1989 SuperJanet was proposed, to re-host JANET on a fibre optic network. Work started in late 1992, and by late 1993 the first 14 sites had migrated to the new 34 Mbit/s ATM system. SuperJanet also moved solely to IP.

In 1995 SuperJanet2 started, adding 155 Mbit/s ATM backbones and a 10 Mbit/s SMDS network encompassing some of the original JANET nodes. JANET's mandate now included running metropolitan area networks centred on these sites.

SuperJanet3 created new 155 Mbit/s ATM nodes to fully connect all of the major sites at London, Bristol, Manchester and Leeds, with 34 Mbit/s links to smaller sites around the country.

In March 2001 SuperJanet4 was launched. The key challenges for SuperJanet4 were the need to increase network capacity and to strengthen the design and management of the JANET network to allow it to meet a similar increase in the size of its userbase.

SuperJanet4 saw the implementation of a 2.5 Gbit/s core backbone from which connections to regional network points of presence were made at speeds ranging between 155 Mbit/s to 2.5 Gbit/s depending upon the size of the regional network. In 2002 the core SuperJanet4 backbone was upgraded to 10 Gbit/s.

SuperJanet4 also saw an increase in the userbase of the JANET network, with the inclusion of the Further Education Community and the use of the SuperJanet4 backbone to interconnect schools' networks. The core point of presence (Backbone) sites in SuperJanet4 were Edinburgh, Glasgow, Warrington, Reading, Bristol, Portsmouth, London and Leeds.

In October 2006 the SuperJanet5 project was launched after £29 million of investment. It provides a 10 Gbit/s backbone, with an upgrade path to 40 Gbit/s over the next few years. The new backbone as a result of the SuperJanet5 project is a hybrid network offering, providing both a high speed IP transit service and private bandwidth channel services provisioned over a dedicated fibre network. It is designed not only to fully accommodate the requirements of the traditional JANET user base - all research institutes, universities and further education - but also to meet the needs of a new userbase in the UK's primary and secondary schools.

In April 2011 Verizon helped Janet upgrade 4 central locations to run at 100 Gbit/s bringing it to a national research and education network performance parity with Internet2 (which upgraded its backbone to 100 Gbit/s in October 2007). As of October 2011 they have over 18 million end-users.

Janet6 started to go live in July 2013, and was officially launched at an event at the London Film Museum on 26 November 2013. At launch, Janet6 had an initial capacity of 2 Tbit/s.

== Regions ==
The Janet network is implemented through 18 regions which connect universities, colleges and schools to the Janet network. Most regions are operated by Janet, although a few operate as independent entities working under contract.

Each regional network covers a specific geographical area. As of 2014 the following regional networks are connected to Janet:

- C&NLMAN – Cumbria and North Lancashire
- East of England
- East Midlands
- KPSN Kent Public Services Network (under bespoke contract)
- London
- North West
- North East
- North East Scotland
- Northern Ireland
- PSBA Wales (under bespoke contract)
- South
- South East Scotland
- South West
- South West Scotland
- Thames Valley
- The Highlands and Islands (bespoke contract with University of the Highlands & Islands)
- West Midlands
- Yorkshire and Humberside

== See also ==
- Abilene Network
- Internet in the United Kingdom
- MidMAN
- Protocol Wars
- TERENA
