= SIGCOMM Award for Lifetime Contribution =

The annual SIGCOMM Award for Lifetime Contribution recognizes lifetime contribution to the field of communication networks. The award is presented in the annual SIGCOMM Technical Conference.

SIGCOMM is the Association for Computing Machinery (ACM)'s professional forum for the discussion of topics in the field of communications and computer networks, including technical design and engineering, regulation and operations, and the social implications of computer networking. The SIG's members are particularly interested in the systems engineering and architectural questions of communication.

The awardees have been:

- 2025 Bruce Davie
- 2024 K. K. Ramakrishnan
- 2023 Dina Katabi
- 2022 Deborah Estrin and Henning Schulzrinne
- 2021 Hari Balakrishnan
- 2020 Amin Vahdat and Lixia Zhang
- 2019 Mark Handley
- 2018 Jennifer Rexford
- 2017 Raj Jain
- 2016 Jim Kurose
- 2015 Albert Greenberg
- 2014 George Varghese
- 2013 Larry Peterson
- 2012 Nick McKeown
- 2011 Vern Paxson
- 2010 Radia Perlman
- 2009 Jon Crowcroft
- 2008 Don Towsley
- 2007 Sally Floyd
- 2006 Domenico Ferrari
- 2005 Paul Mockapetris
- 2004 Simon S. Lam
- 2003 David Cheriton
- 2002 Scott Shenker
- 2001 Van Jacobson
- 2000 Andre Danthine
- 1999 Peter Kirstein
- 1998 Larry Roberts
- 1997 Jon Postel
- 1997 Louis Pouzin
- 1996 Vint Cerf
- 1995 David J. Farber
- 1994 Paul Green
- 1993 Robert Kahn
- 1992 Sandy Fraser
- 1991 Hubert Zimmermann
- 1990 David D. Clark
- 1990 Leonard Kleinrock
- 1989 Paul Baran

== See also ==
- Donald Davies
- IEEE Internet Award
- Internet Hall of Fame
- List of computer science awards
- List of Internet pioneers
- List of pioneers in computer science
