= IFIP WG 13.6 - Human Work Interaction Design =

The Working Group 6 on Human Work Interaction Design (HWID) is part of the International Federation for Information Processing (IFIP) and specifically of its technical committee 13 on Human-Computer Interaction (HCI). It focuses on the integration of work analysis and interaction design methods for pervasive and smart workplaces. The group was founded by Annelise Mark-Pejtersen, Torkil Clemmensen and Rikke Orngreen in 2005. HWID has its roots and inspiration from the 70's Cognitive Work Analysis (CWA) methods. Today, HWID is a lightweight version of CWA, addressing the concept of Work in HCI. The mission of the group is to empower users by designing smarter workplaces, in many different work domains. In 2015, the group counted more than 60 members.

== Aims ==
The aims of the HWID working group are:

- To encourage empirical studies and conceptualisations of the interaction among humans, their variegated social contexts and the technology they use both within and across these contexts.
- Promote the use of knowledge, concepts, methods and techniques that enables user studies to procure a better apprehension of the complex interplay between individual, social and organisational contexts and thereby a better understanding of how and why people work in the ways they do.
- Promote a better understanding of the relationship between work-domain based empirical studies and iterative design of prototypes and new technologies.
- Establish a network of researchers, practitioners and domain/subject matter experts working within this field.

== Scope ==
The group provides the basis for an improved cross-disciplinary co-operation and mutual inspiration among researchers, but also leads to a number of new research initiatives and developments, as well as to an increased awareness of HWID in existing HCI educations. Complexity is a key notion in the working group, it is not a priori defined or limited to any particular domains. A main target of the work group is the analysis of and the design for the variety of complex work and life contexts found in different business. It studies how technology is changing human life and work contexts in numerous, multi-faceted ways:

- Interfaces between collaborating individuals; advanced communication networks
- Small and large-scale distributed systems
- Multimedia and embedded technologies
- Mobile technologies and advanced "intelligent" robots
- Communication, collaboration, and problem solving
- Large information spaces, variability, discretion, learning, and information seeking
- Methods, theories, tools, techniques and prototype design on an experimental basis

== Officers ==
- Chair: Elodie Bouzekri – Université de Bretagne Occidentale, France
- Vice Chair: Torkil Clemmensen – Copenhagen Business School, Denmark
- Vice Chair: José Abdelnour-Nocera – University of West London, United Kingdom
- Vice Chair: Barbara Rita Barricelli – Università degli Studi di Brescia, Italy
- Vice Chair: Ganesh Bhutkar – Vishwakarma Institute of Technology, India
- Vice Chair: Xiangang Qin – Beijing University of Posts and Telecommunications, China
- Vice Chair: Judith Molka-Danielsen – Molde University College, Norway
- Secretary Officer: Arminda Guerra Lopes – Polytechnic Institute of Castelo Branco, Portugal
