= Don Towsley =

Don Towsley may refer to:

- Don Towsley (animator) (1912–1986), American animator
- Don Towsley (computer scientist) (born 1949), American computer scientist
