= Amin Vahdat =

Computer scientist and business executive

- Occupations: VP and GM of AI and infrastructure at Google

Academic background
- Education: University of California, Berkeley
- Doctoral advisor: Thomas E. Anderson

Academic work
- Discipline: Computer science
- Institutions: Duke University; University of California, San Diego
- Main interests: Network architecture, network management, software-defined networking

Amin Vahdat is an American computer scientist and business executive. He is vice president and general manager of AI and infrastructure at Google. Before joining Google, he was a computer science professor at University of California, San Diego and Duke University. His academic work has focused on network architecture and software-defined networking.

== Education ==
Vahdat earned a bachelor's degree at the University of California, Berkeley in 1992, followed by a Ph.D. in computer science in 1998. His advisor was Thomas E. Anderson.

== Career ==
=== Duke University ===
As a computer scientist at Duke University, in 2003 Vahdat and a colleague developed and released ModelNet, a software equivalent of a scale model of the internet for testing new programs in order to optimize research provisioning in large networked systems. He also taught Advanced Computer Networks as a professor at Duke. He was promoted to tenure in July 2003.

=== University of California, San Diego ===
Vahdat held the Science Applications International Corporation chair in the department of computer science and engineering at the University of California, San Diego, where he worked from 2004 to 2013. He was also professor of computer science and engineering and director of the university's center for networked systems. He presented research in 2008 explaining how the fundamentals of clustered computing could reduce costs and improve performance when applied to network architecture.

In 2009, Vahdat was a co-author on a paper demonstrating that hierarchical networking structures performed worse than networks run at one shared speed, showing a more cost-effective approach to building networks at scale. Uniform networking became a common approach at major web operations. The ideas in the paper unintentionally paralleled work already underway at Google.

While at UCSD, Vahdat was a primary researcher on Helios, a project that built a pair of test networks to demonstrate switching between traditional electrical networking and optical networking to speed data transfers between servers.

=== Google ===
In 2010, Vahdat joined Google as technical lead for networking, a role he held until 2019. His work focused on network architecture for both data centers and wide area networks. Vahdat's team at Google developed software-defined networking (SDN) to scale data center bandwidth, with the first deployment in 2010. A 2013 paper in SIGCOMM coauthored by Vahdat described how Google designed and created this network. In 2023, the Association for Computing Machinery gave this paper its "Test of Time" award.

In a 2014 SIGCOMM paper, Vahdat and coauthors described the P4 programming language and proposed that it play a role in SDN protocols; this paper also won the Test of Time award, in 2024. He joined Jennifer Rexford and Nick McKeown as a board member of the P4 Language Consortium (P4.org) in July 2016. By 2015, Vahdat was also a Google Fellow. He oversaw the company's design and development of network equipment tailored to its own data center and wide area needs. Vahdat's leadership of networking at Google grew to include compute and storage as well. In 2021, when he was vice president for systems infrastructure, he shared that Google had begun developing custom SoCs.

Vahdat leads Google's efforts to develop its own AI chips. He oversaw the company's work to develop Axion, a proprietary AI chip, in 2024, and Google's seventh-generation Tensor Processing Unit, Ironwood, in 2025.

== Recognitions ==
Vahdat has received the National Science Foundation CAREER Award and, in 2003, the Alfred P. Sloan Fellowship. He became a Fellow of the Association for Computing Machinery (ACM) in 2011. In 2020, the ACM gave Vahdat the SIGCOMM Award for Lifetime Contribution. The National Academy of Engineering elected him as a member in 2023 for his work in creating "datacenter and planet-scale networks that power cloud computer systems."

Vahdat received the 2027 IEEE Koji Kobayashi Computers and Communications Award, "for developing network systems that scale data centers to power modern clouds and machine learning".

== Selected publications ==
- Vahdat, A.; Anderson, T.; Dahlin, M.; Belani, E.; Culler, D.; Eastham, P.; Yoshikawa, C. (1998). "WebOS: Operating system services for wide area applications". Proceedings. The Seventh International Symposium on High Performance Distributed Computing (Cat. No.98TB100244). pp. 52–63. doi:10.1109/HPDC.1998.709956. ISBN 0-8186-8579-4.
- Al-Fares, Mohammad; Loukissas, Alexander; Vahdat, Amin (2008). "A scalable, commodity data center network architecture". ACM SIGCOMM Computer Communication Review. 38 (4): 63–74. doi:10.1145/1402946.1402967.
- Vahdat, Amin; Becker, David (April 2000). "Epidemic routing for partially connected ad hoc networks" (PDF). Technical Report CS-2000-06. Department of Computer Science, Duke University. S2CID 2567320.
- Niranjan Mysore, Radhika; Pamboris, Andreas; Farrington, Nathan; Huang, Nelson; Miri, Pardis; Radhakrishnan, Sivasankar; Subramanya, Vikram; Vahdat, Amin (2009). "PortLand: A scalable fault-tolerant layer 2 data center network fabric". ACM SIGCOMM Computer Communication Review. 39 (4): 39–50. doi:10.1145/1594977.1592575.
- Jain, Sushant; Kumar, Alok; Mandal, Subhasree; Ong, Joon; Poutievski, Leon; Singh, Arjun; Venkata, Subbaiah; Wanderer, Jim; Zhou, Junlan; Zhu, Min; Zolla, Jon; Hölzle, Urs; Stuart, Stephen; Vahdat, Amin (2013). "B4: Experience with a globally-deployed software defined WAN". ACM SIGCOMM Computer Communication Review. 43 (4): 3–14. doi:10.1145/2534169.2486019.
- Bosshart, Pat; Daly, Dan; Gibb, Glen; Izzard, Martin; McKeown, Nick; Rexford, Jennifer; Schlesinger, Cole; Talayco, Dan; Vahdat, Amin; Varghese, George; Walker, David (2014). "P4: Programming protocol-independent packet processors". ACM SIGCOMM Computer Communication Review. 44 (3): 87–95. doi:10.1145/2656877.2656890.
