= Raj Jain =

American computer scientist

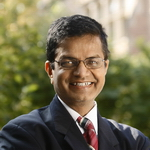
- Prof. Raj Jain.
- Citizenship: American
- Education: Awadhesh Pratap Singh University; Indian Institute of Science; Harvard University
- Known for: The Art of Performance Analysis; DEC-bit
- Awards: CDAC-ACCS Foundation Award; ACM SIGCOMM Test of Time Award
- Scientific career
- Fields: Computer science
- Workplaces: Washington University in St. Louis; Ohio State University; MIT

Raj Jain is an Indian American computer scientist and the Barbara H. and Jerome R. Cox, Jr. Professor of Computer Science and Engineering at Washington University in St. Louis. He is known for his contributions to computer networking, particularly in congestion control, performance analysis, and traffic modelling. He is a co-inventor of the DECbit congestion avoidance scheme.

== Early life and education ==
He earned his Bachelor of Engineering in Electrical Engineering from A. P. S. University, Rewa, in 1972. He then completed a Master of Engineering in Computer Science and Controls at the Indian Institute of Science, Bangalore, in 1974. He moved to the United States for doctoral studies and received a Ph.D. in Applied Mathematics and Computer Science from Harvard University in 1978.

== Career ==
Jain began his career working at Digital Equipment Corporation in Littleton, Massachusetts, from 1978 to 1994, becoming a Senior Consulting Engineer. During his time at Digital, Jain was also a visiting scholar and honorary lecturer at the Massachusetts Institute of Technology in 1983–84, 1985, and 1987.

In 1994, Jain joined Ohio State University as a professor in the Department of Computer and Information Sciences, where he remained until 2002. He co-founded Nayna Networks, Inc. in San Jose, California, in 2000, and served as its Chief Technology Officer until 2007.

In 2005, Jain joined Washington University in St. Louis as a professor of Computer Science and Engineering. In 2016, he was named the Barbara H. and Jerome R. Cox, Jr. Professor.

== Research ==
=== Congestion control and the DECbit scheme ===
Jain has worked on network congestion management. He is a co-inventor of the DECbit scheme, a binary feedback congestion avoidance mechanism that was implemented in DECnet and later influenced standards for OSI, Frame Relay, and ATM networks. The scheme allows network switches to signal impending congestion to end hosts by setting a bit in packet headers, enabling hosts to adjust their transmission rates proactively. The paper describing this work, "Analysis of the Increase and Decrease Algorithms for Congestion Avoidance in Computer Networks," received the ACM SIGCOMM Test of Time Award in 2006.

=== Performance analysis ===
Jain is the author of The Art of Computer Systems Performance Analysis (John Wiley & Sons, 1991), which became a standard textbook on the subject. The book won the Computer Press Association's "Best Advanced How-to Book, Systems" award in 1991. The book introduced several widely used concepts and metrics, including Jain's fairness index, a quantitative measure for evaluating the fairness of resource allocation in computer systems and networks.

=== ATM Networks ===
Jain served as the Editor of the ATM Forum Performance Testing Specification. He was involved in the work that led to the development and adaptation of the explicit forward congestion indication (EFCI) scheme for traffic management in ATM networks.

=== WiMAX 4G Networks ===
Between 2006 and 2009, Jain served on the Application Working Group at the WiMAX Forum, which was developing the first 4G standard. He was the editor of the WiMAX Systems Evaluation Methodology document. In 2008, he received the WiMAX Forum Individual Contribution Award.

== Awards ==
- ACM SIGCOMM Lifetime Achievement Award (2017)
- James B. Eads Award from the Academy of Science, St. Louis (2018)
- A. Michelson Award from the Computer Measurement Group (2015)
- Distinguished Alumnus Award from the Indian Institute of Science Alumni Association (2014)
- ACM SIGCOMM Test of Time Award (2006) for his DECbit paper
- CDAC-ACCS Foundation Award (2009)
- WiMAX Forum Individual Contribution Award (2008)
- siliconindia Leadership Award for Excellence and Promise in Business and Technology (1999)

== Selected publications ==
His book The Art of Computer Systems Performance Analysis published by Wiley Interscience won the 1991 Best Advanced How-to Book, Systems award from Computer Press Association.

=== Books ===
- Jain, R. (1991). The Art of Computer Systems Performance Analysis: Techniques for Experimental Design, Measurement, Simulation, and Modeling. John Wiley & Sons. ISBN 978-0471503361.
- Jain, R. (2003). High-Performance TCP/IP: Concepts, Issues, and Solutions. Prentice Hall.
- Kotsopoulos, S.; Jain, R., eds. (2010). Quality of Service Architectures for Wireless Networks: Performance Metrics and Management. IGI Global. ISBN 978-1615206803.

=== Selected journal articles ===
- Jain, R.; Routhier, S. A. (1986). "Packet trains: Measurements and a new model for computer network traffic". IEEE Journal on Selected Areas in Communications. 4 (6): 986–995.
- Jain, R.; Ramakrishnan, K. K. (1988). Congestion avoidance in computer networks with a connectionless network layer: Concepts, goals and methodology. Proceedings of the Computer Networking Symposium. pp. 134–143.
- Chiu, D. M.; Jain, R. (1989). "Analysis of the increase and decrease algorithms for congestion avoidance in computer networks". Computer Networks and ISDN Systems. 17 (1): 1–14.
- Jain, R. (1990). "Congestion control and traffic management in ATM networks: Recent advances and a survey". Computer Networks and ISDN Systems. 28 (13): 1723–1738.
- Bhamare, D.; Samaka, M.; Erbad, A.; Jain, R.; Gupta, L.; Chan, A. (2017). "Optimal virtual network function placement and resource allocation in multi-cloud service function chaining architecture". Computer Communications. 102: 1–16. (Received 2020 Best Research Paper Award from Elsevier)
