= IEEE Koji Kobayashi Computers and Communications Award =

Technical award

- Awarded for: outstanding contributions to the integration of computers and communications
- Presented by: Institute of Electrical and Electronics Engineers
- First award: 1986
- Website: IEEE Koji Kobayashi Computers and Communications Award

The IEEE Koji Kobayashi Computers and Communications Award is a Technical Field Award of the IEEE established in 1986. This award has been presented annually since 1988 for outstanding contributions to the integration of computers and communications.

The award is named in honor of Koji Kobayashi, who has been a leading force in advancing the integrated use of computers and communications.

The award may be presented to an individual, multiple recipients or team of up to three people.

Recipients of this award receive a bronze medal, certificate, and honorarium.

The award is sponsored by NEC.

== Recipients ==
- 1988: Stuart Wecker
- 1989: Alexander G. Fraser
- 1990: Elwyn R. Berlekamp
- 1991: Stephen S. Lavenberg
- 1991: Martin Reiser
- 1992: Vinton G. Cerf
- 1992: Robert E. Kahn
- 1993: Gottfried Ungerboeck
- 1994: Jonathan Shields Turner
- 1995: Norman Abramson
- 1996: K. Mani Chandy
- 1997: Tim Berners-Lee
- 1998: Jack Keil Wolf
- 1999: Whitfield Diffie
- 1999: Martin Hellman
- 1999: Ralph Charles Merkle
- 2000: Ronald L. Rivest
- 2000: Adi Shamir
- 2000: Leonard Adleman
- 2001: John M. Cioffi
- 2002: Van Jacobson
- 2003: Bruce Hajek
- 2004: No Award
- 2005: Frank Kelly
- 2006: Nicholas F. Maxemchuk
- 2007: Donald F. Towsley
- 2008: Don Coppersmith
- 2009: Nick McKeown
- 2010: Larry L. Peterson
- 2011: Thomas J. Richardson
- 2011: Rüdiger L. Urbanke
- 2012: Jean Walrand
- 2013: Thomas Anderson
- 2014: George Varghese
- 2015: Albert Greenberg
- 2016: Leandros Tassiulas
- 2017: Kannan Ramchandran
- 2018: Victor Bahl
- 2019: R. Srikant
- 2020: Balaji Prabhakar
- 2021: Hari Balakrishnan
- 2022: Muriel Medard
- 2023: Ion Stoica
- 2024: Anja Feldmann
- 2025: Steven H. Low
- 2026: Dina Katabi
- 2027: Amin Vahdat
