= Henning Schulzrinne =

German-American computer scientist

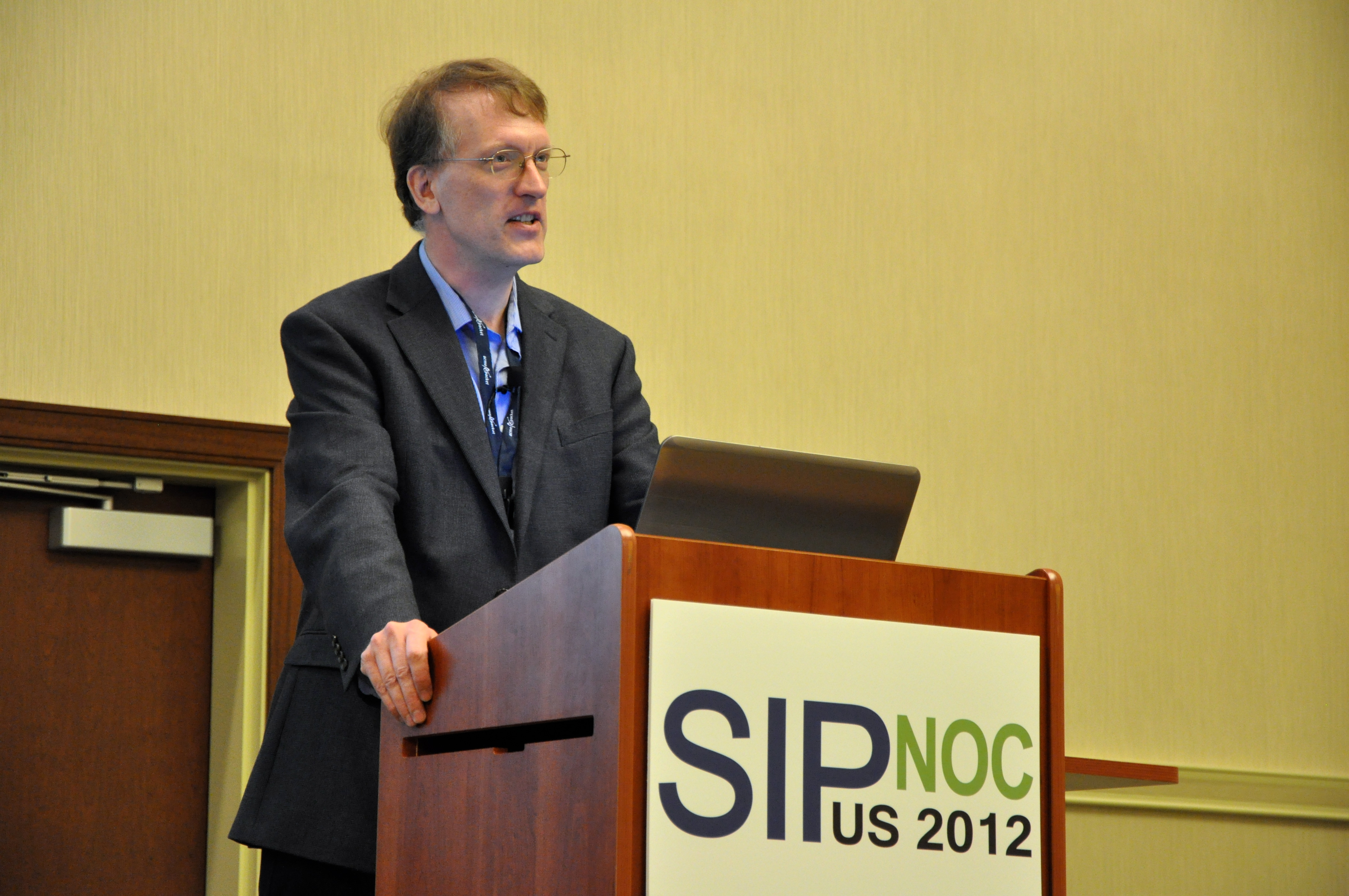
- Schulzrinne at the SIPNOC 2012
- Born: Cologne, Germany
- Education: German TU Darmstadt (BA); University of Cincinnati (MS); University of Massachusetts Amherst (PhD 1993)
- Known for: Voice over IP; Session Initiation Protocol
- Awards: ACM Fellow (2014); Internet Hall of Fame Innovators (2013); IEEE Internet Award (2016)
- Scientific career
- Fields: Computer science Internet multimedia
- Workplaces: Columbia University; AT&T Bell Laboratories
- Doctoral advisor: James Kurose
- Website: www.cs.columbia.edu/~hgs/

Henning Schulzrinne is a German-American computer engineer who led research and development of the voice over IP network protocols.

== Life ==
Schulzrinne studied engineering management at the Department of Electrical Engineering and Information Technology of the German Technische Universität Darmstadt in Darmstadt, where he earned his Vordiplom (cf. Diplom), then went on to earn his M.Sc. at the University of Cincinnati and his Ph.D. at the University of Massachusetts Amherst.

From 1992 to 1994 he worked for AT&T Bell Laboratories.

From 1994 to 1996 he worked in Berlin at the Forschungs-Institut für Offene Kommunikationssysteme (GMD FOKUS), an institute of the now-defunct Gesellschaft für Mathematik und Datenverarbeitung (GMD), which became part of the Fraunhofer Society as Fraunhofer Institute for Open Communication Systems. He joined the faculty of the Computer Science department at Columbia University in 1998, and served as chair and Julian Clarence Levi Professor.

He served as a co-chair of the Internet Technical Committee of the IEEE Communications Society. Schulzrinne is an editor of the Journal of Communications and Networks.

Schulzrinne has contributed to standards for voice over IP (VoIP). He co-designed the Session Initiation Protocol along with Mark Handley, the Real Time Streaming Protocol, the Real-time Transport Protocol, the General Internet Signaling Transport protocol, part of the Next Steps in Signaling protocol suite. Overall, as of March 7, 2024, his publications have been cited over 65,000 times, and he has an h-index of 95.

Schulzrinne was the chief technology officer (CTO) for the United States Federal Communications Commission, from December 19, 2011 to 2014.

He was elected as an Association for Computing Machinery (ACM) Fellow in 2014 for contributions to the design of protocols, applications, and algorithms for Internet multimedia.

In 2006, Schulzrinne was elevated to IEEE fellow for contributions to the design of protocols, applications, and algorithms for Internet multimedia.
