= Jon Crowcroft =

British computer scientist (born 1957)

Jon Crowcroft FRS FREng
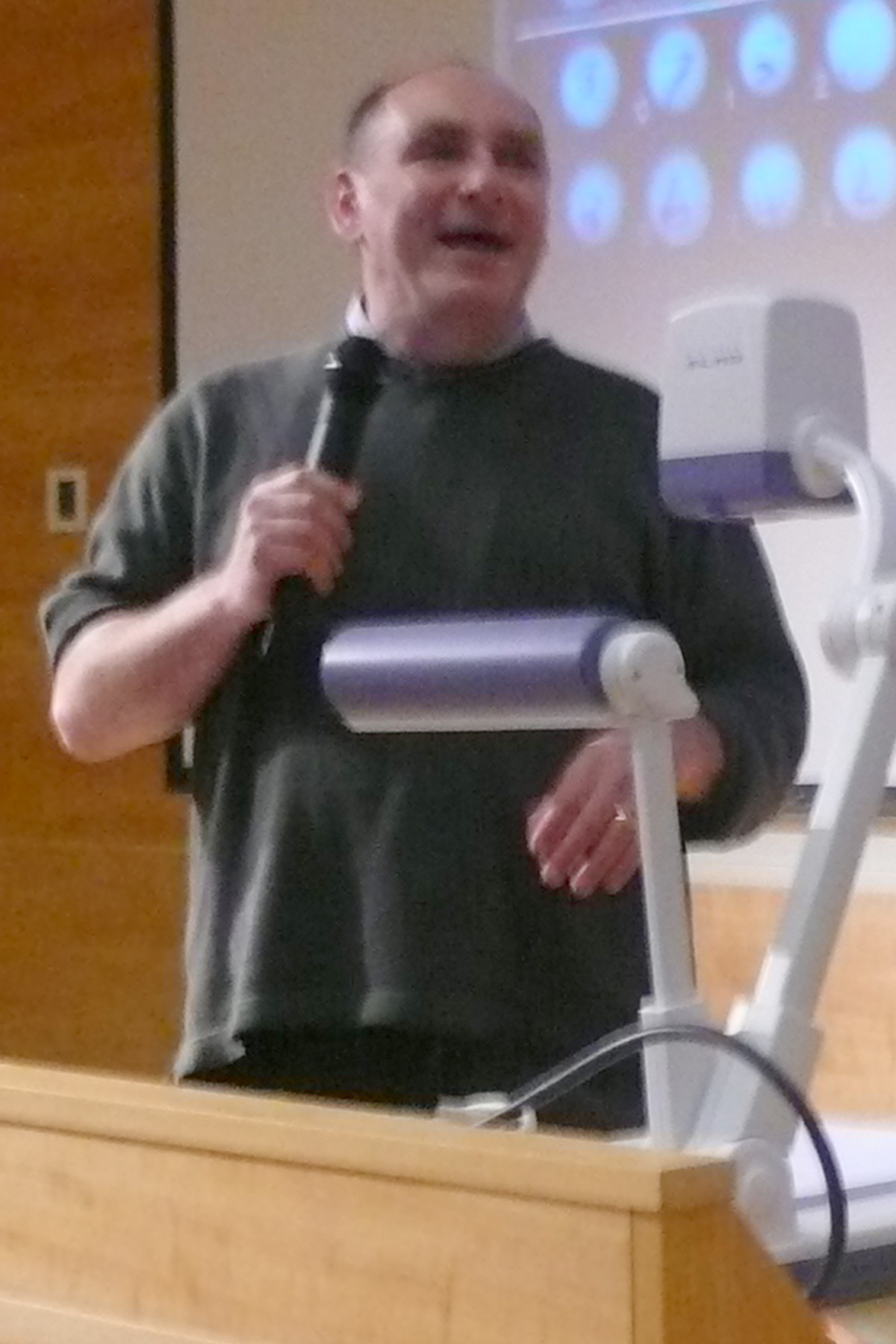
- Crowcroft in 2009
- Born: Jonathan Andrew Crowcroft; 23 November 1957 (age 68); England
- Education: Westminster School
- Alma mater: University of Cambridge (BA); University College London (MSc, PhD)
- Awards: ACM Fellow (2002); SIGCOMM Award (2009)
- Scientific career
- Fields: Computer Networks; Distributed systems Quality of service
- Workplaces: University of Cambridge; University College London
- Thesis: Lightweight protocols for distributed systems (1993)
- Doctoral advisor: Peter T. Kirstein
- Doctoral students: Mark Handley Pan Hui
- Website: www.cl.cam.ac.uk/~jac22/

Jonathan Andrew Crowcroft (born 23 November 1957) is the Marconi Professor of Communications Systems in the Department of Computer Science and Technology, University of Cambridge, a visiting professor at the Department of Computing at Imperial College London, and the chair of the programme committee at the Alan Turing Institute.

== Education ==
Crowcroft's father was the psychiatrist Andrew Crowcroft and his mother the concert pianist Kyla Greenbaum. He was educated at Westminster School and graduated with a Bachelor of Arts degree in physics in 1979 from the University of Cambridge where he was an undergraduate student of Trinity College. He then gained a Master of Science degree in computing in 1981 and PhD in 1993, both from University College London.

== Career and research ==
Crowcroft joined the University of Cambridge in 2001, prior to which he was Professor of Networked Systems at University College London in the Computer Science Department. After he stepped down from UCL, he was succeeded by his former PhD student Mark Handley. As of 2020 he is a Fellow of Wolfson College, Cambridge.

Crowcroft contributed to successful start-up projects. He has been a member of the Scientific Council of IMDEA Networks Institute since 2007. He served on the advisory board of Max Planck Institute for Software Systems .

Crowcroft has written, edited and co-authored books and publications which have been adopted internationally in academic courses, including TCP/IP & Linux Protocol Implementation: Systems Code for the Linux Internet, Internetworking Multimedia and Open Distributed Systems.

Crowcroft has also done research in theoretical network science, particularly in the area of Turing switches, and he has suggested to replace general-purpose computers acting as network switches with specially-built hardware dedicated to packet switching, as well as using optical technology for the same purpose.

He is a director of the Matrix Foundation.

=== Awards and honours ===
Crowcroft was elected a Fellow of the Royal Society in 2013. His nomination reads:

Professor Jon Crowcroft is distinguished for his many seminal contributions to the development of the Internet. His work on satellite link interconnection techniques in the 1980s paved the way for rural broadband; his work on standards for video and voice on IP networks helped extend the Internet to multimedia; and in the 2000s he founded the field of opportunistic networking.

He was elected an ACM Fellow in 2003, a chartered fellow of the British Computer Society, a Fellow of the Institution of Electrical Engineers and a Fellow of the Royal Academy of Engineering, as well as a Fellow of the Institute of Electrical and Electronics Engineers (IEEE) in 2004. He was a member of the Internet Architecture Board 1996–2002, and attended most of the first 50 Internet Engineering Task Force (IETF) meetings.

Crowcroft served as general chair for the ACM SIGCOMM conference between 1995 and 1999, and received the SIGCOMM Award in 2009. The award to Crowcroft was

"for his pioneering contributions to multimedia and group communications, for his endless enthusiasm and energy, for all of the creative ideas he has so freely shared with so many in the networking community, and for always being outside the box".
