= Zhi-Li Zhang =

Chinese computer scientist

Zhi-Li Zhang is a computer scientist, the McKnight Distinguished University Professor and the Qwest Chair Professor of Computer Science at the University of Minnesota - Twin Cities. He leads the Networking Research Group at the university. Zhi-Li obtained his PhD in computer science from the University of Massachusetts in 1997 under Don Towsley and Jim Kurose. He has published a large number of papers in the field of routing, computer communication and multimedia communication.

Zhi-Li Zhang graduated with B.S. in Computer Science with highest distinction from Nanjing University, Nanjing, China. While a junior student at Nanjing, Zhi-Li led a team of senior students for their senior design projects. He was one of five students selected for graduate study exempted from the graduate school entrance exam at Nanjing University. Shortly afterwards, he was awarded a highly selective fellowship from the Chinese National Committee for Education for graduate study in Europe, and studied at the Computer Science Department, Århus University, Denmark. Zhi-Li is a Fellow of IEEE.

Zhang has been selected by the University of Massachusetts Amherst School of Computer Science as the 2014 recipient of the Outstanding Achievement and Advocacy (OAA) Award for Outstanding Achievement in Research.
