= Arturo Azcorra =

Spanish scientist

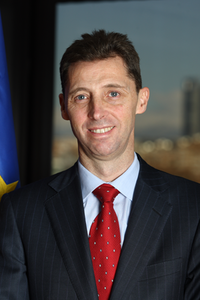
- Arturo Azcorra in Madrid, March 2010
- Born: Arturo Azcorra; November 8, 1962 (age 63); Santurce, Vizcaya, Spain
- Citizenship: Spanish
- Education: Universidad Politécnica de Madrid
- Known for: Research on network science, telecommunications and telematics
- Scientific career
- Fields: 5G, Computer Science, Telematics (Computer and Communications) and Telecommunications Engineering
- Workplaces: Universidad Carlos III de Madrid (University Carlos III of Madrid) IMDEA Networks Institute
- Thesis: [ Formal modeling of synchronous systems] (1990)
- Website: IMDEA Networks site UC3M site MS-Access and SQL Book site

Arturo Azcorra (born November 8, 1962, in Santurce, Spain) is a Spanish scientist and telecommunications engineer.

== Life and career ==
Azcorra graduated from Loy Norrix High School (Michigan, USA) in 1980. In 1986, he received his M.Sc. degree in Telecommunications Engineering from the Universidad Politécnica de Madrid (Madrid, Spain), with "Sobresaliente" (Outstanding) grade, and was subsequently awarded the Price Waterhouse Prize for Best Student in 1986. He then obtained his Ph.D. in Telecommunications Engineering from the same university in 1989, receiving the National Award COIT-AEIT-ANIEL (AMETIC) to the Best PhD Thesis (Premio Nacional a la Mejor Tesis Doctoral). In 1993, he obtained an MBA from the Instituto de Empresa, graduating first in his class.

He began his career in the Madrid Subway Company (Compañía del Metropolitano de Madrid), while simultaneously performing research work in telecommunications at UPM. He was an associate professor at UPM from 1989 to 1998, when he moved to University Carlos III of Madrid (UC3M) where he became Full Professor and founder of the NETCOM Research Group on Networks and Communication Technologies, which he has coordinated since, at the Department of Telematics Engineering. He was later appointed Deputy Vice-Provost for Academic Infrastructures at the UC3M and held this post from 2000 to 2007. He was a Visiting Researcher at ICSI University of California at Berkeley (USA) in 1999 and at the Massachusetts Institute of Technology (MIT) (USA) in 2002. In 1998 he was appointed Director of the UC3M Telefónica Chair and worked in this role until 2009. In June 2002 he earned the distinction of being named IEEE (Institute of Electrical and Electronics Engineers) Senior Member. From 2003 to 2008 he was Director of REDIMadrid, the Telematics Research Network of the Community of Madrid. He is the founder and director since 2006 (except for occasional periods in which he has held other public positions) of the international research institute IMDEA Networks.

In November 2009 he was appointed Director General for Technology Transfer and Corporate Development at the Spanish Ministry of Science and Innovation (MICINN), a position he held until his appointment as Director General at the Centre for the Development of Industrial Technology (Centro para el Desarrollo Tecnológico Industrial - CDTI), the Spanish agency to fund research in private companies, on May 30, 2010. In February 2012 he returned to his post as full professor at the Department of Telematics Engineering at University Carlos III of Madrid and Director of IMDEA Networks Institute. In April 2021, he took leave from these posts, and incorporated to the Spanish Ministry of Economic Affairs and Digital Transformation as Director General of Telecommunications and Organization of Audiovisual Media Services On October 6, 2022, he was promoted to Undersecretary of Telecommunications and Organization of Audiovisual Media Services. In July 2023, he regained his position as full professor in the Department of Telematics Engineering at Universidad Carlos III de Madrid and director of IMDEA Networks Institute.

In October 2018 he was appointed member of the European Academy of Sciences "Academia Europaea". He received, in 2020, the prestigious Reginald Fessenden Award for his contributions to the development of 5G technology. Granted by the ACM-MSWIM International Conference, the award ("for his pioneering contribution to the midhaul and core of 5G networks") recognises scientific contributions in the fields of wireless communications, networking and mobile systems.

In November 2021 he was elevated to the rank of IEEE Fellow in the “Technical Leader” category, for the scientific and industrial impact of his research contributions to the development of 5G technology. In this way, he becomes the first scientist in Spain to be designated IEEE Fellow in the “Technical Leader” category.

He has participated in or directed 63 advanced research projects, mainly in the Framework Programmes for Research and Technological Development of the European Union. He was the coordinator of the European Networks of Excellence E-NET, E-NEXT and CONTENT, and of the European projects CARMEN, TRILOGY, 5G-CROSSHAUL and 5G-TRANSFORMER. He has licensed technological developments in telecommunications for Ericsson-Telebit Denmark, NEC Europe and Huawei China. He has also performed advisory and technological consulting work for organizations such as Servicom, the European Space Agency, MFS-Worldcom, the Community of Madrid, RENFE, REPSOL, the Spanish Ministry of Education, Culture and Sports (Ministerio de Educación, Cultura y Deporte), Ericsson-Telebit and the Spanish Ministry of Science and Technology. He was a Member of the advisory board of the Future Internet PPP, European Commission, since February 2012 until December 2017. He was a member of General Assembly of the 5G Infrastructure Association from 2013 to 2021. From 2013 to 2017 he was also a member of the Steering Board of the NetWorld2020 European Technology Platform (ETP) (formerly Net!Works & ISI ETPs), during which he was also the Chairman of its Expert Advisory Group. Since 2014 he is partnership board member of the European Union 5G-PPP, and from 2015 to 2021 he was vice-president of the 5TONIC Laboratory. Arturo Azcorra is the founder of the ACM CoNEXT conference series, of which he was the first General Chair. He was a member of the Standing Committee of the IEEE INFOCOM Conference from 2005 to 2014, and has chaired prestigious international conferences such as IEEE INFOCOM, ACM CoNEXT and PROMS-IDMS. He has authored over one hundred and sixty technical publications in journals and international and national conferences.

== Partial bibliography ==
- Ortega, Felipe and Gomez-Villafuertes, Rosa and Benito-León, María and Martínez de la Torre, Margaret and Olivos-Oré, Luis A. and Arribas-Blazquez, Marina and Gomez-Gaviro, María Victoria and Azcorra, Arturo and Desco, Manuel and Artalejo, Antonio R. and Puelles, Luis and Miras-Portugal, María Teresa (2021), Salient brain entities labelled in P2rx7-EGFP reporter mouse embryos include the septum, roof plate glial specializations and circumventricular ependymal organs, Brain Structure and Function. January 2021
- Nogales, Borja and Vidal, Iván and Sanchez-Aguero, Victor and Valera, Francisco and Gonzalez, Luis. F and Azcorra, Arturo (2020), OSM PoC 10 Automated Deployment of an IP Telephony Service on UAVs using OSM. In: ETSI-OSM PoC 10, 11 February 2020, Madrid, Spain.
- Pastor, Antonio and Cuevas, Rubén and Cuevas, Ángel and Azcorra, Arturo (2020), Establishing Trust in Online Advertising With Signed Transactions, IEEE Access, 9. February 2020
- Pastor, Antonio and Pärssinen, Matti and Callejo, Patricia and Vallina, Pelayo and Cuevas, Rubén and Cuevas, Ángel and Kotila, Mikko and Azcorra, Arturo (2019), Nameles: An intelligent system for Real-Time Filtering of Invalid Ad Traffic . In: The Web Conference 2019 (WWW 2019), 13–17 May 2019, San Francisco, CA, USA.
- Martin Perez, Jorge and Cominardi, Luca and Bernardos, Carlos Jesús and de la Oliva, Antonio and Azcorra, Arturo (2019), Modeling Mobile Edge Computing Deployments for Low Latency Multimedia Services , IEEE Transactions on Broadcasting, ISSN 0018-9316. February 2019
- Molner, Nuria and de la Oliva, Antonio and Stavrakakis, Ioannis and Azcorra, Arturo (2019), Optimization of an integrated fronthaul/backhaul network under path and delay constraints, Ad Hoc Networks, 83. pp. 41–54, ISSN 1570-8705. February 2019
- Nogales, Borja and Vidal, Iván and García-Reinoso, Jaime and López, Diego R. and Rodríguez, Juan and Azcorra, Arturo (2019), Design and Deployment of an Open Management and Orchestration Platform for Multi-site NFV Experimentation, IEEE Communications Magazine, ISSN 0163-6804. January 2019
- I. Vidal, I. Soto, F. Valera, J. Garcia, A. Azcorra, Multiparty Services in the IP Multimedia Subsystem in IP Multimedia Subsystem (IMS) Handbook, Edited by Mohammad Ilyas, Publisher: CRC Pr I Llc. Books, pp. 361–380. ISBN 978-1-4200-6459-9. New York. 2008
- I. Ucar, E. Pebesma, A. Azcorra, Measurement Errors in R, The R Journal, Ed. The R Foundation, Vol. PP, Issue PP, ISSN 2073-4859. December 2018
- I. Ucar, J. A. Hernandez, P. Serrano, A. Azcorra, Design and Analysis of 5G Scenarios with simmer: An R Package for Fast DES Prototyping, IEEE Communications Magazine, Ed. IEEE Communications Society, Vol. 56, Issue 11, pp. 145–151, ISSN 0163-6804. November 2018
- F. Gringoli, P. Serrano, I. Ucar, N. Facchi, A. Azcorra, Experimental QoE evaluation of multicast video delivery over IEEE 802.11aa WLANs, IEEE Transactions on Mobile Computing, Ed. IEEE Communications Society, ISSN 1536-1233. Volume: 18, Issue: 1. On Page(s): 2549–2561. doi:10.1109/TMC.2018.2876000. November 2019
- I. Vidal, P. Bellavista, V. Sanchez-Aguero, J. Garcia-Reinoso, F. Valera, B. Nogales, A. Azcorra, Enabling Multi-Mission Interoperable UAS Using Data-Centric Communications, MDPI Sensors, Ed. MDPI AG, Vol. 18, Issue 10, no. 3421, ISSN 1424-8220. October 2018
- P. Caballero-Garces, A. Banchs, G. de Veciana, X. Costa-Perez, A. Azcorra, Network Slicing for Guaranteed Rate Services: Admission Control and Resource Allocation Games, IEEE Transactions on Wireless Communications, Vol. 17, Issue 10, pp. 6419–6432, ISSN 1536-1276. October 2018
  Patents:
- Arturo Azcorra, Guillermo Ibáñez, Elisa Rojas, Isaías Martínez-Yelmo. Method for establishing and clearing paths and forwarding frames for transport connections, and network bridge. Patent P201301133 / ES2540595 B2.
- Guillermo Agustín Ibáñez Fernández, Juan Antonio Carral Pelayo, Alberto García Martínez, Arturo Azcorra, Data frame routing method and network bridge (Procedimiento de encaminamiento de tramas de datos y puente de red), Patent WO2010097489 A1, US20120044837 A1
- Carlos Jesús Bernardos Cano, Ignacio Soto Campos, María Calderón Pastor, Arturo Azcorra, Albert Banchs Roca, Procedimiento y dispositivo de gestion de movilidad IP localizada basada en la red, red de acceso y dispositivos de paserala de acceso fijos y moviles a dominios con movilidad IP localizada, Spanish Patent ES2360678
- Arturo Azcorra, Michal Kryczka, Marcelo Bagnulo, Iljitsch Van Beinjum, Alberto García Martínez. Procedure of IPv4 address generation. P200930504
- Guillermo Agustín Ibáñez Fernández, Arturo Azcorra, Alberto García Martínez, Procedimiento de gestión de enlaces en el nivel de enlace de datos para redes de comunicaciones, procedimiento de encaminamiento de tramas de datos, dispositivo de interconexión de redes y red que combina ambos procedimientos, Spanish Patent Application No. P200702358 OEPM
