= IEEE Internet Award =

IEEE award

- Awarded for: recognizes exceptional contributions to the advancement of Internet technology for network architecture, mobility, and/or end-use applications
- Presented by: Institute of Electrical and Electronics Engineers
- First award: 1999
- Website: IEEE Internet Award

IEEE Internet Award is a Technical Field Award established by the IEEE in June 1999. The award is sponsored by Nokia Corporation. It may be presented annually to an individual or up to three recipients, for exceptional contributions to the advancement of Internet technology for network architecture, mobility and/or end-use applications. Awardees receive a bronze medal, certificate, and honorarium.

== Recipients ==
The following people have received the award:

- 2000 – Paul Baran, Donald W. Davies, Leonard Kleinrock and Larry Roberts (for packet switching) (Note: Packet switching, the technique used for data communication on the Internet, was invented independently by Paul Baran and Donald Davies in the early- and mid-1960s, respectively. Neither Leonard Kleinrock nor Larry Roberts were involved until the implementation of the ARPANET in the late 1960s (see also: Packet switching § The "paternity dispute").)
- 2001 – Louis Pouzin (for datagrams) (Note: The concept of datagrams was first conceived by Donald Davies who was the first to implement packet switching in the single-node NPL network and carried out simulation studies on wide-area networks. Louis Pouzin directed the implementation of the datagram model in a wide-area network, CYCLADES, which was the first network to make reliability the responsibility of the hosts, not the network (whereas the ARPANET used a virtual circuit service). Pouzin's approach pioneered the techniques that enable internetworking on the Internet.)
- 2002 – Steve Crocker (for approach enabling evolution of Internet Protocols)
- 2003 – Paul Mockapetris (for the domain name system; the Mockapetris citation specifically cites Jon Postel who had died and therefore could not receive the award for their DNS work)
- 2004 – Raymond Tomlinson and David H. Crocker (for networked email)
- 2005 – Sally Floyd (for contributions in congestion control, traffic modeling, and active queue management)
- 2006 – Scott Shenker (for contributions to the study of resource sharing)
- 2007 – not awarded
- 2008 – Mike Brescia, Ginny Travers, and Bob Hinden (for early IP routers)
- 2009 – Lixia Zhang (for Internet architecture and modeling)
- 2010 – Stephen Deering (for IP multicasting and IPv6)
- 2011 – Jun Murai (for leadership in the development of the global Internet, especially in Asia)
- 2012 – Mark Handley (for exceptional contributions to the advancement of Internet technology for network architecture, mobility, and/or end-use applications)
- 2013 – David L. Mills (for significant leadership and sustained contributions in the research, development, standardization, and deployment of quality time synchronization capabilities for the Internet)
- 2014 – Jon Crowcroft (for contributions to research in and teaching of Internet protocols, including multicast, transport, quality of service, security, mobility, and opportunistic networking)
- 2015 – KC Claffy and Vern Paxson (for seminal contributions to the field of Internet measurement, including security and network data analysis, and for distinguished leadership in and service to the Internet community by providing open-access data and tools)
- 2016 – Henning Schulzrinne
- 2017 – Deborah Estrin
- 2018 – Ramesh Govindan
- 2019 – Jennifer Rexford
- 2020 – Stephen Casner and Eve Schooler (for contributions to Internet multimedia standards and protocols)
- 2023 – Ian Foster and Carl Kesselman (for contributions to the design, deployment, and application of practical Internet-scale global computing platforms)
- 2024 – Walter Willinger
- 2025 – Yakov Rekhter
- 2026 – David D. Clark
- 2027 – Matthew Roughan

== See also ==
- Internet Hall of Fame
- IEEE Alexander Graham Bell Medal
- List of computer science awards
- List of Internet pioneers
- SIGCOMM Award
