= Magdolna Zimányi =

Hungarian mathematician, computer scientist

- Born: Magdolna Györgyi; November 29, 1934; Budapest, Hungary
- Died: March 27, 2016 (aged 81); Budapest, Hungary
- Other name: Magda Zimányi
- Citizenship: Hungary
- Education: Eötvös Loránd University
- Spouse: József Zimányi
- Awards: Neumann Prize
- Scientific career
- Fields: Mathematics, computer science
- Workplaces: KFKI Research Institute for Particle and Nuclear Physics

Magdolna Zimányi, née Magdolna Györgyi, (Budapest, November 29, 1934 – Budapest, March 27, 2016) was a Hungarians mathematician, computer scientist, one of the pioneers of the Hungarian computer science.

== Life and work ==
Zimányi was born in 1934 in Budapest and from 1953 she studied mathematics at Eötvös Loránd University, graduating in 1959. She was employed at the Central Physical Research Institute (KFKI).

She represented the user community in the early days of Hungary's computer network efforts and made her voice heard.

After retiring in 1992, she remained active in the computing community.

Between her retirement in 1992 and 2004, she served as head of the Computer Network Center at the KFKI Particle and Nuclear Physics Research Institute (RMKI). She has also been active in the Technical Council of the National Information Infrastructure Development Program (NIIF) (as a representative of KFKI) for many years, in the early 2000s, as chairman of the program's Ethics Committee, she played an important role in drafting the User Code. Since 1995, she has also been involved in the development of the Hungarian Electronic Library.

=== Memberships ===
- Technical Advisory Subcommittee of the High-Energy Physical Computing Coordination Committee, Internet Company,
- John Neumann Computer Science Society,
- Hungarian Electronic Library Association.

=== Awards ===
In 2000, she won the John von Neumann Prize of the John von Neumann Computer Society.

In 2008, she won the Hungarnet Prize of the Hungarnet Association.

== Personal life ==
Her husband, József Zimányi, was a Széchenyi Prize winner physicist.

== See also ==
Zimányi's CV in English
