= Don Towsley (computer scientist) =

American computer scientist

Donald F. Towsley
- Born: 1949 (age 76–77)
- Citizenship: United States
- Education: University of Texas
- Known for: Computer Performance Foundation
- Scientific career
- Fields: Computer Science, Networking
- Workplaces: University of Massachusetts Amherst
- Thesis: Local balance models of computer systems (1975)
- Doctoral advisor: K. Mani Chandy
- Doctoral students: Zhi-Li Zhang

Donald Fred Towsley (born 1949) is an American computer scientist who has been a distinguished university professor in the College of Information and Computer Sciences at the University of Massachusetts Amherst.

His research interests include network measurement, modeling, and analysis. Towsley currently serves as editor-in-chief of the IEEE/ACM Transactions on Networking and on the editorial boards of Journal of the ACM and IEEE Journal of Selected Areas in Communications. He is currently the chair of the IFIP Working Group 7.3 on computer performance measurement, modeling, and analysis. He has also served on numerous editorial boards, including those of IEEE Transactions on Communications and Performance Evaluation. He has been active in the program committees for numerous conferences, including IEEE Infocom, ACM SIGCOMM, ACM SIGMETRICS, and IFIP Performance conferences for many years, and has served as technical program co-chair for ACM SIGMETRICS and Performance conferences. He has received the 2008 ACM SIGCOMM Award, the 2007 IEEE Koji Kobayashi Computers and Communications Award, the 2007 ACM SIGMETRICS Achievement Award, the 1999 IEEE Communications Society William Bennett Award, and several conference/workshop best paper awards. He is also the recipient of the University of Massachusetts Chancellor's Medal and the Outstanding Research Award from the College of Natural Science and Mathematics at the University of Massachusetts. He is one of the founders of the Computer Performance Foundation.
