= KC Claffy =

Internet researcher

Kimberly Claffy
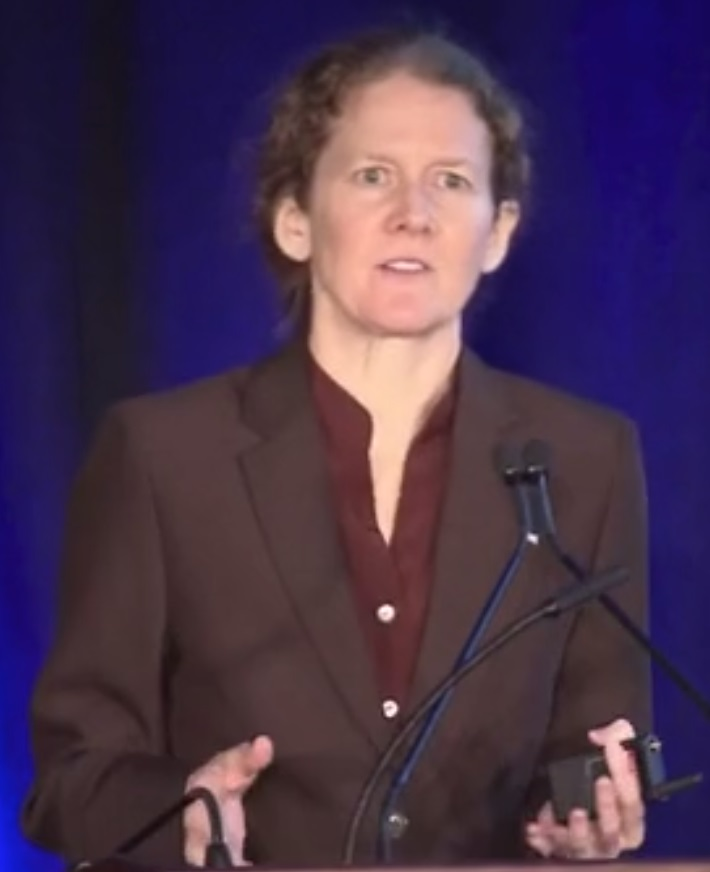
- Claffy speaking in 2019
- Education: Stanford University; University of California, San Diego
- Scientific career
- Workplaces: University of California, San Diego
- Thesis: Internet traffic characterization (1994)

Kimberly C. "KC" Claffy is director of the Center for Applied Internet Data Analysis at the University of California, San Diego. In 2017 she was awarded the Jonathan B. Postel Service Award and inducted into the Internet Hall of Fame in 2019.

== Early life and education ==
Claffy studied symbolic systems at Stanford University. She earned her doctoral degree under the supervision of George Polyzos at the University of California, San Diego in 1994. Claffy was a summer intern at AT&T, Harry Diamond Laboratories and the Federal Reserve. Her years in graduate school occurred during the period in which the federal government of the United States relaxed control over the Internet. The Internet became a more commercial entity interconnecting a rapidly-increasing number of networks, hosts and users, and as the World Wide Web expanded, the nature of the traffic on the Internet changed. This inspired Claffy to develop initiatives that share Internet data and support Internet data analysis.

== Research and career ==
Claffy was promoted to associate research scientist in 1994 and research scientist in 2007. In 1996 Claffy founded the Center for Applied Internet Data Analysis (CAIDA) in the San Diego Supercomputer Center at the University of California, San Diego. At CAIDA Claffy works on internet cartography that characterizes the changing nature of Internet topology and Internet traffic dynamics. This involves mapping and measuring internet data in an effort to make the internet safer for the general public. Claffy is part of the Named Data Networking project.

In 2015, Claffy shared the IEEE Internet Award with Vern Paxson for "seminal contributions to the field of Internet measurement, including security and network data analysis, and for distinguished leadership in and service to the Internet community by providing open-access data and tools". Her work established definitions for the concept of Internet "traffic flows", in which most packets flowing across the Internet are understood to be part of a connection with coherent characteristics, rather than isolated, unconnected messages.

In 2019, Claffy was inducted into the Internet Hall of Fame for her groundbreaking work in the field of internet measurement and analysis. She was awarded an National Science Foundation Convergence Accelerator planning grant to evaluate the feasibility of creating an open knowledge network on the properties of the Internet identifier system.

== Awards and honors ==
- 2000 San Francisco Women on the Web Top 25 Women of the Web
- 2015 IEEE Internet Award
- 2016 N2Women 10 Women in Networking/Communications That You Should Know
- 2017 Internet Society Jonathan B. Postel Service Award
- 2018 π Person of the Year
- 2019 Internet Hall of Fame

== Selected publications ==
- Claffy, KC (December 2024). "A path forward: improving Internet routing security by enabling zones of trust". Journal of Cybersecurity. 10 (1). arXiv:2312.03305. doi:10.1093/cybsec/tyae023. S2CID 265713349.
- Claffy, KC (September 2024), "Differential Privacy, Firm-level Data and the Binomial Pathology", IEEE Security & Privacy, no. 1, pp. 2–10, doi:10.1109/MSEC.2024.3430837
- Claffy, KC (May 2022). "Challenges in measuring the Internet for the public Interest". Journal of Information Policy. 12. doi:10.5325/jinfopoli.12.2022.0003.
