= Nicholas F. Maxemchuk =

American electrical engineer

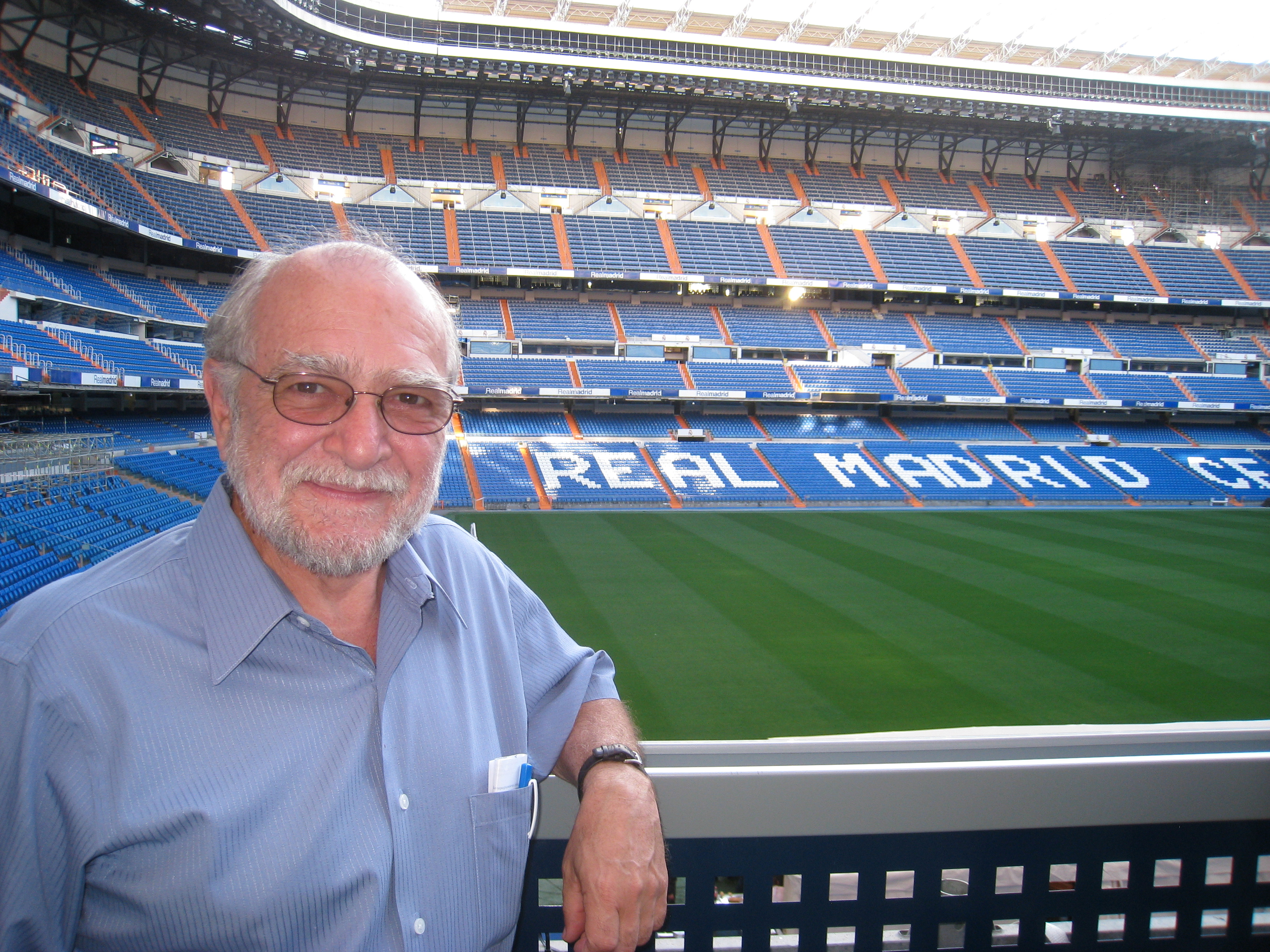
Prof. Nicholas F. Maxemchuk

Nicholas F. Maxemchuk is an American electrical engineer.

== Biography ==
Maxemchuk graduated from the City College of New York in 1968 with a Bachelor of Engineering (Electrical), he received his master's degree in 1970 from the Moore School of Electrical Engineering at the University of Pennsylvania, and obtained his Doctor of Philosophy in Systems Engineering from the University of Pennsylvania in 1975.

He served as a member of the technical staff at the David Sarnoff Research Center from 1968–1976, and Bell Labs from 1976–1984, where he subsequently served as head of distributed systems research Department (1984–1996) and technology leader (1996–2001). In 2001 he became full professor at Columbia University, and chief of research at IMDEA Networks Institute from 2008.

Maxemchuk was named IEEE Fellow in 1989 for contributions to Metropolitan and Local Area Networks, and received the 2006 IEEE Koji Kobayashi Computers and Communications Award.
