= Albert Greenberg =

American computer scientist

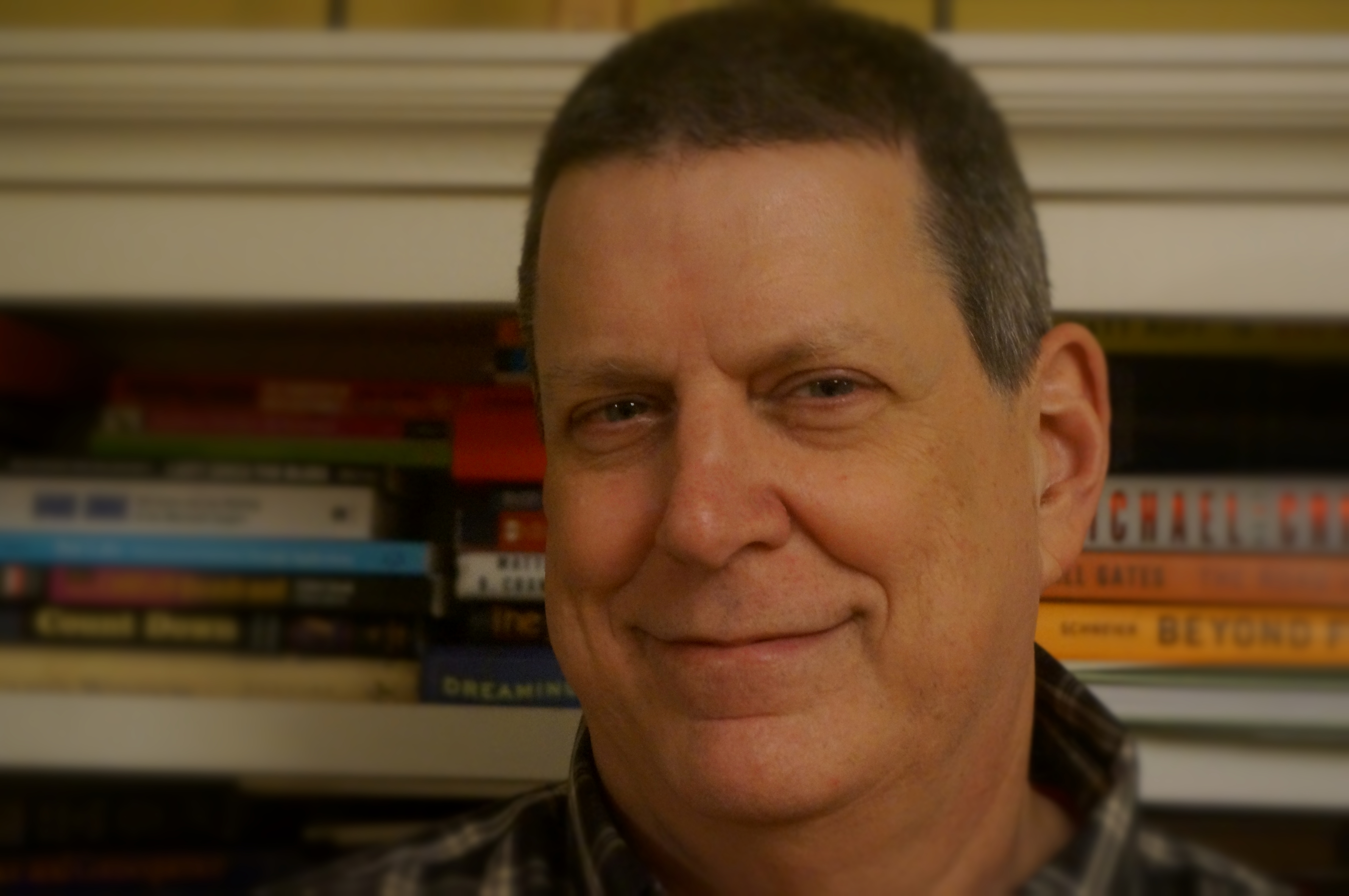
- Spouse: Kathryn Greenberg
- Children: 4
- Awards: National Academy of Engineering, 2016; SIGCOMM Award, 2015; Koji Kobayashi Award, 2015; ACM Fellow; ACM Test of Time Award, 2015; ACM Sigmetrics Test of Time Award, 2013
- Scientific career
- Fields: Networking; Cloud computing
- Workplaces: Microsoft

Albert Greenberg is an American software engineer and computer scientist who is notable for his contributions to the design of operating carrier and datacenter networks as well as to advances in computer networking and cloud computing. He served as the Chief Architect Officer at Uber until 2026.

Prior to joining Uber, Greenberg served as Corporate Vice President at Microsoft and acted as director of development for Microsoft Azure, a cloud computing infrastructure platform that coordinates data centers around the world. In contrast to hard-wired computer networks, firms such as Microsoft are turning increasingly to software-defined networking (or SDN) approaches to run its cloud computing networks by managing virtual networks across "millions of servers". He oversaw development of technologies that keep the network running in the cloud, so that when component failures happen, software systems pinpoint the failures and "route around the faulty components;" the technology permits data centers to be "software-defined", allowing the cloud to grow rapidly while being flexible to meet changing needs, as he explained in 2015 in eWeek magazine. His research focused on the infrastructure of cloud services, management of enterprise networks, data center networks, and systems monitoring.

Greenberg received his PhD in 1983 at the University of Washington as an ARCS Scholar (Seattle Chapter). He has won numerous awards for his contributions: he is an ACM Fellow, received the IEEE Koji Kobayashi Computers and Communications Award in 2015 for his "fundamental contributions to large-scale backbone networks and data-center networks," and won the prestigious SIGCOMM Award in 2015 for "pioneering the theory and practice of operating carrier and datacenter networks." In addition, he publishes in numerous scholarly journals on topics such as networking and cloud computing. He began his career at AT&T Labs and became division manager for network measurement engineering and research, was promoted to executive director and an AT&T Fellow, and was hired by Microsoft in 2007 as a principal researcher. In 2016, he was inducted into the United States National Academy of Engineering for "contributions to the theory and practice of operating large carrier and data center networks."
