= Jean Walrand =

American computer scientist

- Education: University of California, Berkeley
- Awards: SIGMETRICS achievement award
- Scientific career
- Workplaces: University of California, Berkeley
- Thesis: Computer Networks: A Martingale Approach (1979)
- Doctoral advisor: Pravin Varaiya
- Notable students: Nick Bambos, Gustavo de Veciana, George Kesidis, Takis Konstantopoulos, Nick McKeown
- Website: walrandpc.eecs.berkeley.edu

Jean Camille Walrand is a professor of Computer Science at UC Berkeley. He received his Ph.D. from the Department of Electrical Engineering and Computer Sciences department at the University of California, Berkeley, and has been on the faculty of that department since 1982. He is the author of "An Introduction to Queueing Networks" (Prentice Hall, 1988), "Communication Networks: A First Course" (2nd ed. McGraw-Hill, 1998), "Probability in Electrical Engineering and Computer Sciences: An Application-Driven Course" (Amazon, 2014), and "Uncertainty: A User Guide" (Amazon, 2019), and co-author of "High-Performance Communication Networks" (2nd ed, Morgan Kaufmann, 2000), "Communication Networks: A Concise Introduction" (Morgan & Claypool, 2010), "Scheduling and Congestion Control for Communication and Processing networks" (Morgan & Claypool, 2010), and "Sharing Network Resources" (Morgan & Claypool, 2014). His research interests include stochastic processes, queuing theory, communication networks, game theory, and the economics of the Internet.

Walrand has received numerous awards for his work over the years. He is a Fellow of the Belgian American Education Foundation and of the IEEE for the development of highly efficient techniques for the analysis, control, and simulation of stochastic networks and stochastic resource allocation problems. Additionally, he is a recipient of the Lanchester Prize, the Stephen O. Rice Prize., the IEEE Kobayashi Award, and the ACM SIGMETRICS Achievement award.
