= ARCS Foundation =

American nonprofit volunteer women's organization

ARCS Foundation, Inc. (Achievement Rewards for College Scientists) is an American nonprofit volunteer women's organization that promotes US competitiveness by providing financial awards to academically outstanding U.S. citizens studying to complete degrees in science, technology, engineering, mathematics (STEM), and health disciplines at 51 of the nation's leading research universities. The organization has awarded more than $136 million to 11,000 scholars since 1958. ARCS Foundation Scholars have produced thousands of research publications and patents, secured billions in grant funding, started science-related companies, and played a significant role in teaching and mentoring young people in the STEM pipeline.

== History ==
In 1958, a group of visionary women volunteers from Los Angeles, California, led by Florence Malouf met with California Institute of Technology President Lee DuBridge to discuss what could be done to elevate the nation's scientific leadership and competitiveness. They created a unique partnership between science and society, and ARCS Foundation soon became a model for women's science educational philanthropy. Learn more.

Investing in graduate students through grants was viewed as a targeted, effective way to further science philanthropy in America. ARCS Foundation also brought stronger focus to women's leadership in science philanthropy as the organization grew nationally. Initially focused on the US space program, chapters were formed in Houston and Washington, D.C. Chapters, where they cultivated strong relationships, raising funds and supporting scholars from leading universities in their home states.

More chapters followed, affiliating with the national organization to advocate for education and research and to engage public awareness of science challenges and successes.

Supported disciplines have expanded to include basic and applied scientific research in 42 areas of study, from agriculture to zoology, under parameters established by ARCS Foundation's founders and expressed by the objective as declared on the Caltech campus in Pasadena, CA on September 18, 1958: ". . . raise money for scholarships and fellowships (now known as Scholar Awards) . . . for the support of both undergraduate and graduate students."

== Chapters ==
ARCS Chapters carry the mission of the organization to different regions of the United States.

The 15 ARCS Chapters, in the order they were established, are:

- Los Angeles Founding, 1958
- Metro Washington, 1968
- Northern California, 1970
- Honolulu, Hawaii, 1974
- Phoenix, Arizona, 1975
- Colorado, 1976
- Illinois, 1977
- Seattle, Washington, 1978
- San Diego, 1985
- Atlanta, Georgia, 1992
- Orange County, California, 1999
- Pittsburgh, 2003
- Oregon, 2004
- Minnesota, 2009
- Utah, 2009

== ARCS Scholars ==
ARCS Scholars are selected annually by qualifying departments of science, engineering and medical research within ARCS Foundation's 51 academic partner universities and colleges. ARCS Foundation neither solicits nor accepts applications from potential ARCS Scholars. ARCS Foundation's academic partners identify and select ARCS Scholars who meet the following criteria to be eligible for funding:

- be a United States citizen
- be enrolled in a full-time degree-granting program, majoring in fields of science, engineering or medical research
- have a GPA of 3.5 or higher

== Notable Alumni and ARCS Scholar Alumni Hall of Fame ==
Notable ARCS Scholars include computing pioneer Albert Greenberg. Since 2015, the organization has inducted particularly distinguished ARCS Scholars into the ARCS Alumni Hall of Fame for demonstrating leadership in one or more of the following areas:

- Scientific innovation and discovery
- Recognition by peers
- Mentoring future scientists to fill in the STEM pipeline
- Founding or leading an organization that has had a significant impact on the US economy
- Increasing awareness of the importance of national scientific competitiveness

=== Members of the ARCS Foundation Scholar Alumni Hall of Fame ===
- Shannon Brownlee, MS, for transformative healthcare advocacy (2015)
- David A. Dixon, PhD, for developing alternatives to chlorofluorocarbons (2022)
- Heidi Hammel, PhD, for leadership on the James Webb Space Telescope (2023)
- Barabara Jacak, PhD, for helping develop the PHENIX large collider (2015)
- Ralph B. James, PhD, for advances in photoconductive science (2015)
- Stephen M. Lichten, PhD, for contributions to aircraft GPS innovation (2016)
- David Mangelsdorf, PhD, for contributions to treatment in human disease (2015)
- Peter J. McDonnell, MD, for innovative advances in ophthalmology (2019)
- Jessica Meir, PhD, for inspirational and historic all-female spacewalk (2020)
- F. Peter Schloerb, PhD, for leadership on the Alfonso Serrano Large Millimeter Telescope (2021)
- Suneel I. Sheikh, PhD, for developing the Space Integrated Navigation System (2017)
- Christopher Stubbs, PhD, for astronomical discoveries including dark energy (2017)
- Neil deGrasse Tyson, PhD, for communication raising scientific awareness (2018)
- Jeanne VanBriessen, PhD, for leadership in water sustainability (2016)

== Academic Partners/Approved Universities ==
ARCS Approved Universities are U.S. universities whose science, technology, engineering, and mathematics departments are ranked in the top 100 in the country.

U.S. universities and colleges where ARCS Scholars are found:

- Arizona State University
- California Institute of Technology
- Carnegie Mellon University
- Colorado School of Mines
- Colorado State University
- Emory University
- Georgetown University
- Georgia Institute of Technology
- Harvey Mudd College
- Illinois Institute of Technology
- Johns Hopkins University
- Loyola University Chicago
- Morehouse College
- Northern Arizona University
- Northwestern University
- Oregon Health & Science University
- Oregon State University
- Pomona College
- San Diego State University
- San Francisco State University
- Scripps Research
- Stanford University
- The George Washington University
- The University of Arizona
- University of California, Berkeley
- University of California, Davis
- University of California, Irvine
- University of California, Los Angeles
- University of California, Merced
- University of California, San Diego
- University of California, San Francisco
- University of California, Santa Cruz
- University of Chicago
- University of Colorado Anschutz Medical Campus
- University of Colorado at Boulder
- University of Colorado at Colorado Springs
- University of Colorado at Denver
- University of Colorado School of Dental Medicine
- University of Georgia
- University of Hawaiʻi at Mānoa
- University of Illinois at Urbana-Champaign
- University of Maryland
- University of Minnesota
- University of Oregon
- University of Pittsburgh
- University of San Diego
- University of Southern California
- University of Utah
- University of Virginia
- University of Washington
- Washington State University

== Outcomes ==
=== Philanthropic ===
Philanthropic accomplishments include:

- 21,214 awards granted
- $136,886,931 total funding
- 21,214 scholars funded

=== Membership ===
Membership accomplishments include:

- 1,160 members
- 15 national chapters
