= Computer Engineers Association of Spain =

Spanish non-profit association

The Computer Engineers Association of Spain (ATI, Asociación de Técnicos de Informática in Spanish) is a non-profit association of professionals and students from the sector of Information and Communications Technology (ICT). It is based in Spain, where it is established through a number of Chapters. Founded in 1967, it is the most veteran association in the ICT profession in Spain, with the main headquarters in Barcelona and headquarters in Madrid also.

ATI publishes in Spanish the magazine Novática, the oldest magazine in Spain about computing, and also REICIS (Revista Española de Innovación, Calidad e Ingeniería del Software). From 2000 to 2011 publishes also the e-magazine in English UPGRADE: The European Journal for the Informatics Professional, commissioned by CEPIS (Council for European Professional Informatic Societies).

ATI has sixteen working groups covering different areas of the ICT sector and takes part, either as organizer or collaborator, in several events in this field.

ATI is the Spanish representative in International Federation for Information Processing (IFIP), and represents Spanish computer professionals too in CEPIS, an organization from which ATI is a founding member. ATI also has a collaboration agreement with Association for Computing Machinery (ACM).

In Spain, ATI has established collaboration agreements with Ada Spain, ASTIC, Hispalinux, AI2 and RITSI (Asociación Nacional de Estudiantes de Ingenierías e Ingenierías Técnicas en Informática).

ATI expresses its view about different matters (Libre Software, university degrees on Computer Science, Private copying levy, etc.) through communications, press releases and editorial pages at Novática magazine.

In 2017 the Spanish Data Protection Agency imposed on ATI two fines, one of €45,000 (very serious infraction) for transmitting personal data outside the territory of the European Economic Area, and another of €5,000 (mild infraction) for sending e-mails through The Rocket Science Group LLC's Mailchimp service, violating the recipients' right. Appeals from ATI against the sanctions are dismissed successively by the National Court of Spain and the Supreme Court of Spain.
