= Pan Hui =

Computer scientist

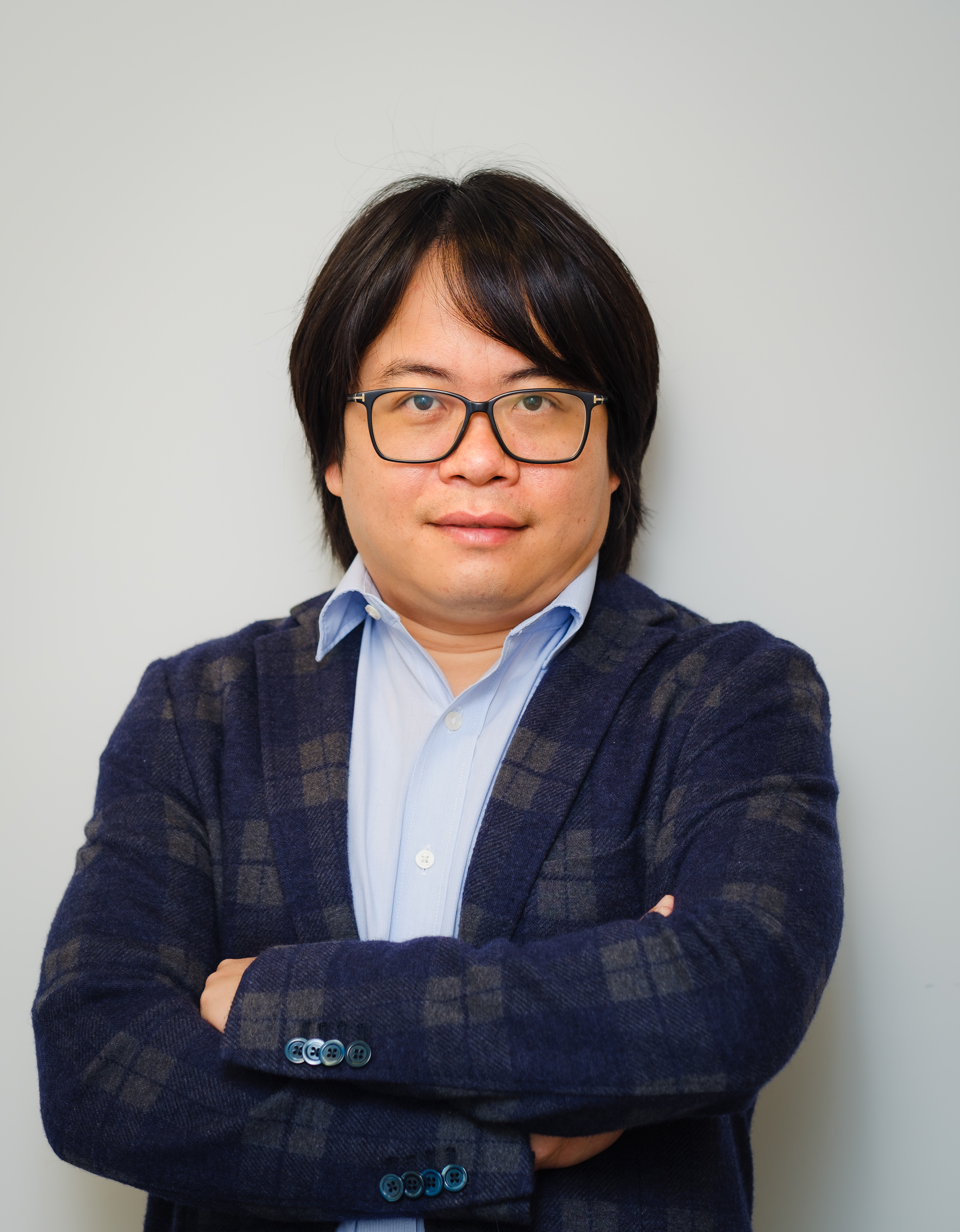
- Hui in 2020
- Education: University of Hong Kong (B.Eng., M.Phil.); University of Cambridge (PhD)
- Scientific career
- Fields: Mobile computing Networking; Augmented reality Data science
- Workplaces: University of Helsinki; The Hong Kong University of Science and Technology
- Thesis: People are the network: experimental design and evaluation of social-based forwarding algorithms (2008)
- Doctoral advisor: Jon Crowcroft

Pan Hui (Chinese: 許彬) is a computer scientist specializing in mobile computing, networking, augmented reality and data science. He received B.Eng. and M.Phil. degrees from the University of Hong Kong and a PhD from the University of Cambridge Computer Laboratory. He holds the Nokia Chair in Data Science and is Professor of Computer Science at the University of Helsinki. He also holds professorships at The Hong Kong University of Science and Technology (HKUST), where he directs the Center for Metaverse and Computational Creativity. He was an ACM Distinguished Scientist in 2016, elected a Fellow of the IEEE in 2018, is a member of the Academia Europaea, and became an International Fellow of the Royal Academy of Engineering in 2020.

== Research ==
Hui holds the Nokia Chair in Data Science at the University of Helsinki, a professorship established through a Nokia Bell Labs Endowment. His research spans opportunistic networking, mobile offloading, augmented reality, the metaverse, and the use of AI in education.

=== Opportunistic networking ===
Hui's early research examined human mobility patterns and their implications for delay-tolerant network design. A 2005 paper at the ACM SIGCOMM Workshop on Delay-Tolerant Networking introduced the concept of pocket switched networks based on measurements of contact patterns at conferences. A follow-up study in IEEE Transactions on Mobile Computing found that inter-contact times between mobile devices follow a power-law distribution, contradicting the exponential model assumed in earlier forwarding algorithms.

=== Mobile offloading ===
During research collaboration with Deutsche Telekom, Hui contributed to work on offloading computation from mobile devices to cloud and edge servers. This included ThinkAir, a system for dynamic resource allocation and parallel execution in the cloud for mobile code offloading, presented at IEEE INFOCOM 2012.

=== Metaverse and augmented reality ===
His work on augmented reality contributed to CloudAR, an open software development kit for mobile augmented reality applications. His research on AR/VR applications covers augmented driving, gesture control, social interaction, visual privacy protection, and assistive technologies for the elderly and visually impaired. He served on the Global Future Council on the Future of the Metaverse at the World Economic Forum. He leads the MetaHKUST project at HKUST, which explores the use of extended reality (XR) in learning and infotainment, connecting the university's Clear Water Bay and Guangzhou campuses.

=== AI in education ===
In 2024, Hui and colleagues at HKUST developed AI-generated lecture avatars for a postgraduate course on social media and immersive technologies, including one modelled on Albert Einstein for a module on game theory. A 2025 article in Nature reported that students responded more positively to photorealistic avatars than to stylized ones. A co-authored paper from the project was included in a Forbes list of notable AI education research publications of 2025.

=== SURREALITY ===
Hui is the founder and curator of SURREALITY (幻實之境), a series of digital art exhibitions combining mixed reality, virtual reality, and artificial intelligence presented at HKUST campuses since 2025.
