= Steven H. Low =

American computer scientist

- Education: Cornell University, University of California, Berkeley
- Known for: Mathematical modeling of Networking, Congestion control, Power systems
- Scientific career
- Fields: Computer Science, Electrical Engineering
- Workplaces: California Institute of Technology
- Doctoral advisor: Pravin Varaiya

Steven H. Low is a Professor of the Computing and Mathematical Sciences Department and the Electrical Engineering Department at the California Institute of Technology. He is known for his work on the theory and mathematical modeling of Internet congestion control, algorithms, and optimization in power systems.

== Academic biography ==
Low received his BS in electrical engineering from Cornell University in 1987, and PhD in electrical engineering from the University of California, Berkeley under the supervision of Pravin Varaiya in 1992. He was with AT&T Bell Labs in Murray Hill, NJ, from 1992 to 1996, the University of Melbourne, Australia, from 1996 to 2000, and joined Caltech in 2000.

== Research ==
Low pioneered a mathematical theory of large-scale networks under end-to-end congestion control such as the Internet, with implications on resource allocation, routing, and network architecture. He and his research team designed a new congestion control algorithm called FAST TCP based on this mathematical theory, built a unique testbed WAN-in-Lab and worked with high-energy physicists (HEP) at Caltech, CERN and around the world to break world records on data transfer. His work is instrumental in changing the focus of congestion control research and land speed record contests from parameter tuning to algorithm design and analysis.

Through a startup called FastSoft, his team actively pursued the deployment of their research which has been accelerating the world's largest content distribution and social networks as well as other Fortune 500 companies.

Upon returning to Caltech after Fastsoft, his research began to focus on the control and optimization of distributed energy resources for future smart grids.

For current research see https://netlab.caltech.edu/

== Awards and honors ==
Low is an IEEE Fellow, a co-recipient of an R&D 100 Award, and IEEE prize papers awards. He has been a Chair/Honorary/Guest/Adjunct Professor with Zhejiang University, China, National Taipei University of Technology, Taiwan, Shanghai Jiaotong University, China, and Swinburne University of Technology, Australia.

Low received the 2025 IEEE Koji Kobayashi Computers and Communications Award.
