= Yakov Rekhter =

Network protocol designer and software programmer

Yakov Rekhter is a well-known network protocol designer and software programmer. He was heavily involved in internet protocol development, and its predecessors, from their early stages.

Dr. Rekhter was one of the leading architects and a major software developer of the NSFNET Backbone Phase II. He co-designed the Border Gateway Protocol (BGP), the core routing protocol of the Internet. He was also one of the lead designers of Tag Switching (of which MPLS is one form), BGP/MPLS based VPNs, and MPLS Traffic Engineering. Among his most recent activities is the work on MPLS Multicast, Multicast in VPLS, and Multicast in BGP/MPLS VPNs (aka 2547 VPNs). His other contributions to contemporary Internet technology include: GMPLS, Classless Inter-Domain Routing (CIDR) and IP address allocation for private Internets.

He is the author or co-author of more than 80 IETF RFCs, and numerous papers and articles on TCP/IP and the Internet. His recent books include: MPLS: Technology and Applications (Morgan Kaufmann, 2000) and Switching in IP Networks: IP Switching, Tag Switching and Related Technologies (Morgan Kaufmann, 1998).

Rekhter joined Juniper Networks in December 2000, where he was a Juniper Fellow until retiring in January 2015. Prior to joining Juniper, Yakov worked at Cisco Systems, where he was a Cisco Fellow. Prior to joining Cisco in 1995, he was a scientist at the IBM T.J. Watson Research Center.

In 2021 he was inducted into the Internet Hall of Fame

In 2025 he received the IEEE Internet Award "“For contributions enabling the creation of a scalable, robust and policy-based Internet.”

== Napkin Story ==
In January 1989, at the 12th IETF meeting in Austin, Texas, Yakov Rekhter, Len Bosack, and Kirk Lougheed sat down at a table to design what ultimately became the Border Gateway Protocol (BGP). The initial BGP design was recorded on two napkins, hence often referenced to as the “Two-Napkin Protocol”. The design on the napkins was expanded to three hand-written sheets of paper from which the first interoperable BGP implementation was quickly developed. A photocopy of these three sheets of paper now hangs on the wall of a routing protocol development area at Cisco Systems in Milpitas, California. In the same year, RFC 1105 was published, and the BGP protocol (in various forms) has been in use on the Internet since 1994.

== Rekhter's Law ==
Rekhter's Law says that "Topology must follow addressing or addressing must follow topology."
