= Isaac L. Auerbach =

American computer scientist (1921–1992)

- Born: October 9, 1921; Philadelphia, Pennsylvania, U.S.
- Died: December 24, 1992 (aged 71); Lower Merion, Pennsylvania, U.S.
- Education: Drexel University (BS, 1943); Harvard University (MS, 1947)
- Occupations: Computer engineer, entrepreneur
- Known for: UNIVAC I, IFIP (founder), Auerbach Publishers
- Awards: National Academy of Engineering (1974); IEEE Computer Society Pioneer Award (1980)
- Engineering career
- Projects: ENIAC (testing), Burroughs Corporation (Magnetic core memory)

Isaac L. Auerbach (October 9, 1921 – December 24, 1992) was an early advocate and pioneer of computing technologies, holder of 15 patents, founding president of the International Federation for Information Processing (1960–1965), a member of the National Academy of Sciences, an executive at the Burroughs Corporation and a developer of first computers at Sperry Univac. International Federation for Information Processing established Isaac L. Auerbach Award in his name.

Auerbach was elected as a Distinguished Fellow of the British Computer Society in 1975 for his pioneering work in computing technologies. He earned a B.S. in electrical engineering from Drexel University in 1943 and an M.S. in applied physics from Harvard University in 1947.
