= Ramesh Govindan =

American computer scientist

- Born: March 12, 1966 (age 60)
- Education: Indian Institute of Technology Madras; University of California, Berkeley
- Awards: IEEE Internet Award (2018)
- Scientific career
- Fields: Computer science
- Workplaces: International Computer Science Institute; University of Southern California
- Doctoral advisor: David P. Anderson

Ramesh Govindan is an Indian-American professor of computer science. He is the Northrop Grumman Chair in Engineering and Professor of Computer Science and Electrical Engineering at the University of Southern California.

== Early life ==
Govindan obtained a Bachelor of Technology degree from the Indian Institute of Technology Madras and then received master's and Ph.D. degrees from the University of California, Berkeley. He then became an associate professor at the University of Southern California, where he researches topology, IP forwarding, and wireless sensor networking.

== Career ==
Govindan was later named the Northrop Grumman Chair in Engineering and Professor of Computer Science and Electrical Engineering. He is a former editor-in-chief of the journal IEEE Transactions on Mobile Computing. He is a Fellow of the Institute of Electrical and Electronics Engineers (IEEE) and the Association for Computing Machinery (ACM).

In 2000, he along with Kannan Varadhan and Deborah Estrin analyzed a way to prevent oscillations in topologies. During the study he have discovered that an inter-domain routing protocol called hop-by-hop is responsible for the unconstrained route selection and therefore the route get oscillated. However, if "safe" mode is enabled, it can shorten route selection as well as the number of errors. A year later, he peered up with Deborah Estrin and Deepak Ganesan of UCLA as well as Scott Shenker to develop braided multipath routing scheme which he claimed to be important alternative for energy-saving recovery after lone and patterned failures. On 14 August 2001 he used simulation to evaluate Geographic and Energy Aware Routing protocol and discovered that it lives longer than its non-geographic energy aware routing counterpart.

In 2002, he and colleagues from both International Computer Science Institute and UCLA have developed a geographic hash table which was later used along with data-centric storage system. In 2004, while working with researchers at the University of California, Los Angeles he discussed wireless sensor network system which is called Wisden which according to him and his colleagues will use end-to-end and hop-by-hop transport recovery which wouldn't require global clock synchronization to transport data. During the same study they have developed wavelet-based technique that will use limited amount of data bandwidth for low-power wireless radios.

In 2006, Govindan and his colleagues have developed a compact version of a pursuit–evasion application called Tenet. In 2010 Govindan, Jeongyeup Paek and Joongheon Kim used smartphones to evaluate remote area power supply. He and his colleagues found that this prototype implementation increased phone lifetimes 3.8 times more than GPS.
