= Pravin Varaiya =

American control theorist (1940–2022)

- Born: 29 October 1940; Bombay, India
- Died: 10 June 2022 (aged 82)
- Education: University of Mumbai; University of California, Berkeley
- Scientific career
- Institutions: University of California, Berkeley
- Thesis: Nonlinear Programming and Optimal Control (1966)
- Doctoral advisor: Lotfi A. Zadeh
- Doctoral students: Jean Walrand; Mark H. A. Davis; Andrea Goldsmith; Steven H. Low; Vivek Borkar; Mustafa Ergen
- Website: paleale.eecs.berkeley.edu/~varaiya/

Pravin Pratap Varaiya (29 October 1940 – 10 June 2022) was Nortel Networks Distinguished Professor in the Department of Electrical Engineering at the University of California, Berkeley.

Varaiya received his B.Sc. from University of Bombay and his Ph.D. degree in electrical engineering in 1963 from University of California, Berkeley.

Varaiya has worked in the areas of control, communication networks and transportation systems. He is the author of High-Performance Communication Networks (with Jean Walrand and Andrea Goldsmith) (2nd edn., Morgan-Kaufmann, 2000).

In 1980, Varaiya became a Fellow of the Institute of Electrical and Electronics Engineers (IEEE). In 1999, he was elected to membership of the National Academy of Engineering and in 2006 he became Fellow of the American Academy of Arts and Sciences. In 2002, he received the IEEE Control Systems Award, "for outstanding contributions to stochastic and adaptive control and the unification of concepts from control and computer science". In 2008, he received the Richard E. Bellman Control Heritage Award from the American Automatic Control Council, "for pioneering contributions to stochastic control, hybrid systems and the unification of theories of control and computation".

Varaiya was ranked within the top 100 scientists in the world in the field of Engineering and Technology.

Varaiya died on 10 June 2022, due to injuries sustained when he was hit by a truck while out walking in April of that year.
