= John von Neumann Computer Society =

Hungarian computer science research association

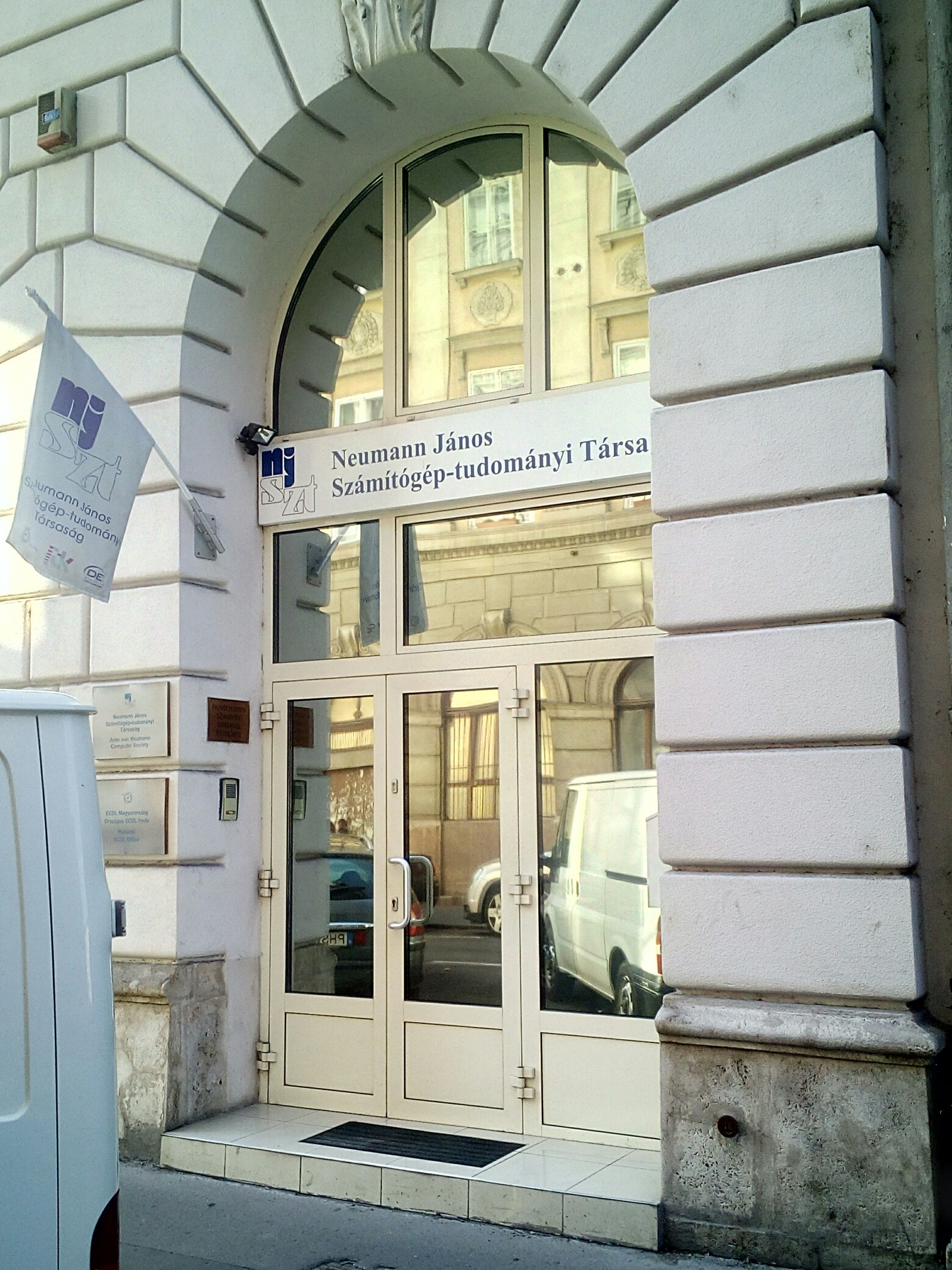
the Neumann János Computer Science Society

The John von Neumann Computer Society (Hungarian: Neumann János Számítógép-tudományi Társaság) is the central association for Hungarian researchers of Information communication technology and official partner of the International Federation for Information Processing founded in 1968.
