= DECbit =

TCP congestion control technique

DECbit is a TCP congestion control technique implemented in routers to avoid congestion. Its utility is to predict possible congestion and prevent it.

== Technique ==
When a router wants to signal congestion to the sender, it adds a bit in the header of packets sent. When a packet arrives at the router, the router calculates the average queue length for the last (busy + idle) period plus the current busy period. (The router is busy when it is transmitting packets, and idle otherwise). When the average queue length exceeds 1, then the router sets the congestion indication bit in the packet header of arriving packets.

When the destination replies, the corresponding ACK includes a set congestion bit. The sender receives the ACK and calculates how many packets it received with the congestion indication bit set to one. If less than half of the packets in the last window had the congestion indication bit set, then the window is increased linearly. Otherwise, the window is decreased exponentially.

This technique dynamically manages the window to avoid congestion and increasing freight if it detects congestion and tries to balance bandwidth with respect to the delay.

Note that this technique does not allow for effective use of the line, because it fails to take advantage of the available bandwidth. Besides, the fact that the tail has increased in size from one cycle to another does not always mean there is congestion.
