= Vishwakarma Institute of Technology =

Autonomous institute in Pune, Maharashtra, India

Vishwakarma Institute of Technology, Pune
- Type: Private
- Established: 1983
- Chairman: SHRI. RAJKUMARJI AGARWAL
- Director: Prof. (Dr.) R.M.Jalnekar
- Location: Pune, Maharashtra, India
- Website: www.vit.edu

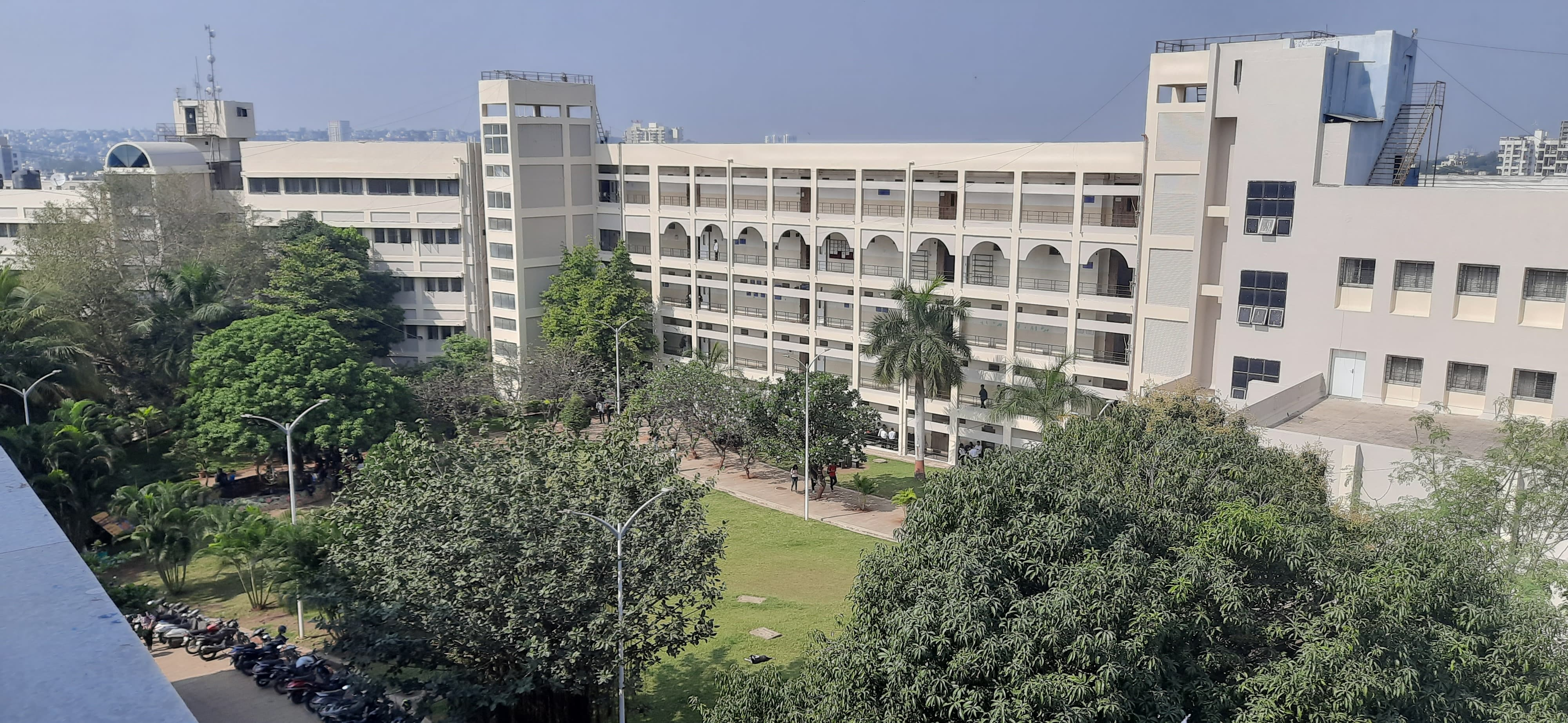
VIT Pune

Vishwakarma Institute of Technology (VIT) is an autonomous institute in Pune, Maharashtra, India. Established in 1983, the institute is affiliated with the Savitribai Phule Pune University and run by the Bansilal Ramnath Agarwal Charitable Trust. The institution is ISO 21001:2018 certified by Quality Austria Central Asia in February 2023, and was accredited ('A++' Grade) by National Assessment and Accreditation Council (NAAC), Bangalore from May 2024 until 2031.

== History ==
Vishwakarma Institute of Technology is run by Bansilal Ramnath Agarwal Charitable Trust (BRACT). The Trust was established on the 16th of June 1975 under the Bombay Trust Act of 1950. The Trust undertakes educational, religious, and social activities. As per Indian mythology, ‘Vishwakarma’ was an architect-engineer of the Gods. BRACT has promoted schools and professional training institutes such as Vishwakarma Institute of Technology, Vishwakarma Institute of Information Technology, Vishwakarma Institute of Management, Vishwakarma Schools and colleges, Maritime Institute, and Vishwakarma Global Business School.

== Campus ==
The campus is spread over 7 acres (28,000 m^2). It consists of four buildings, one cafeteria, a coffee store, a breakfast centre, NPB, a new seminar hall and a fully air-conditioned auditorium with ceiling fans.

The students' hostel is located about 3.5 km off-campus.

== Organisation and Administration ==
Governance

VIT, Pune is governed by the managing trustee with the help of the appointed chairman and the director. The key people in the execution of the institute's activities are the director assisted by head of various departments and Dean (Administration), Dean (Academics), Dean (Finance), Dean (Examination), Dean (Research and Development), Dean (Quality Assurance), Dean (Student Career Counselin g & Guidance), Dean (Industrial Relations), Dean (Student Activities- Technical), Dean (Industrial Project Consultancy), Dean (Faculty Development) and Dean (Analytics). The Administration is managed by other administrative officers.

Departments

The Institute runs 12 undergraduate, 3 post-graduate, and various other programmes. The programmes are affiliated with the Savitribai Phule Pune University (SPPU), Pune. The academic departments in VIT, Pune include the following.

- Computer Engineering
- Information Technology
- Computer Science and Engineering (Data Science)
- Computer Science (Software Engineering)
- Computer Science and Engineering (IoT and Cybersecurity including Blockchain)
- Instrumentation and Control Engineering
- Mechanical Engineering
- Civil Engineering
- Electronics & Telecommunication Engineering
- Artificial Intelligence & Data Science
- Computer Science and Engineering Artificial Intelligence
- Computer Science and Engineering Artificial Intelligence and Machine Learning

Focussing primarily on engineering, VIT offers courses in design, humanities, data sciences, artificial intelligence, computer applications. The Institute conducts various educational courses under B. Tech, M.Tech, Ph.D., MCA, Undergraduate SEDA. Admission to the B.Tech. programme is done through JEE Main as well as MHT-CET. Scores in GATE / MHT-CET exam is mandatory to be eligible for admission in the M.Tech. programme. In 2010 the institute tied up with Penn State University for an undergraduate student exchange programme in engineering.

== Rankings ==
University and college rankings

Engineering – India
- NIRF (2024): 151-200

In 2025 National Institutional Ranking Framework ranked it in the 100 - 150 band among engineering colleges.

Previously, NIRF ranked it in the 151-200 band among engineering colleges in 2023.

It held 33rd Rank (Overall Ranking) in the 175 Engineering Institute Rankings 2021 conducted by Times Engineering Survey. 24th Rank in the Top 125 Private Engineering Institute Rankings 2021condcuted by Times Engineering Survey. 36th Rank overall in the India Today Survey Ranking 2021.

Ranked in the Platinum category at the AICTE-CII survey 2020 and ranked 165th among engineering colleges in 2020 by The National Institutional Ranking Framework (NIRF). It also received ‘Band A Ranking’ (Rank between 6th and 25th) by ARIIA Ranking 2020 (Private or self-financed college/institutes).

The All India Engineering College Survey 2019 by Chronicle, ranked VIT, Pune at #11. ranked. no. 3 among Private Engineering Colleges in West Zone, Source: The Week – Hansa Research Survey 2019 it was also ranked 9th by the All -India Survey 2019 under private engineering institute ranking.

VIT, Pune has obtained A++grade with a score of 3.65 in NAAC accreditation.

Best College in India Award, Hall of fame Rio +22 2015 for United Nations Decade of Sustainable Energy, for All India Programme by Centre of United Nations.
