= Gustavo de Veciana =

American computer scientist and engineer

Gustavo de Veciana is an American computer scientist and engineer, who is currently a Cullen Trust for Higher Education Endowed Professor at the University of Texas at Austin. He is a 1993 Ph.D. graduate of the University of California at Berkeley. He has taught undergraduate and graduate courses in telecommunication networks, probability and random processes, analysis and design of communication networks, digital communications, and information theory. His research focuses on the analysis and design of communication and computing networks, data-driven decision-making in man-machine systems, and applied probability and queueing theory. In 2009, he was designated a Fellow of the Institute of Electrical and Electronics Engineers for his contributions to the analysis and design of communication networks.
