= Mark Handley (computer scientist) =

Mark Handley FRS
- Mark Handley in 2019
- Born: Mark James Handley
- Education: University College London (PhD)
- Known for: XORP; Session Initiation Protocol; Multipath TCP
- Awards: Royal Society Wolfson Research Merit Award (2003); IEEE Internet Award (2012); Roger Needham Award (2007); SIGCOMM Award (2019)
- Scientific career
- Fields: Networking; Computer networks Communications; Systems
- Workplaces: University College London; OpenAI; Broadcom; International Computer Science Institute
- Thesis: On internet multimedia conference control (1997)
- Doctoral advisor: Jon Crowcroft
- Website: www0.cs.ucl.ac.uk/staff/M.Handley

Mark James Handley FRS is Professor of Networked Systems in the Department of Computer Science of University College London since 2003, where he leads the Networks Research Group. and also works at OpenAI on high performance networks for AI training clusters.

== Education ==
Handley received his PhD from UCL in 1997, under the supervision of Jon Crowcroft.

== Career and research ==
While at the International Computer Science Institute (ICSI), Handley co-founded the AT&T Center for Internet Research, as well as the XORP open-source router project (2000).

Handley is a contributor to Internet Engineering Task Force (IETF) standards and a member of the IETF Routing Area Directorate and the Transport Area Directorate. Previously he was a member of the Internet Architecture Board (IAB) and chaired the IETF Multiparty Multimedia Session Control working group and the IRTF Reliable Multicast Research Group. He is the author or co-author of 34 Request for Comments (RFCs), including the Session Initiation Protocol, Multipath TCP and a series of other network protocols.

In 2019 he co-founded Correct Networks with Costin Raiciu to develop high performance protocols for AI networking. Correct Networks was acquired by Broadcom in 2022. At Broadcom, he worked to develop the Ultra Ethernet Transport protocol. In 2024 he moved to OpenAI to work on networking for very large AI training clusters, where he co-authored MRC (Multipath Reliable Connection) which OpenAI uses to network their training supercomputers.

=== Awards and honours ===
Handley was awarded a Royal Society Wolfson Research Merit Award in 2003, and received the 2007 Roger Needham Award. He was the recipient of the 2012 IEEE Internet Award "For contributions to Internet multicast, telephony, congestion control and the shaping of open Internet standards and open-source systems in all these areas.", and the 2019 SIGCOMM Award "For fundamental contributions to Internet multimedia, multicast, congestion control and multi-path networks, and the standardization of Internet protocols in these domains".

Handley was elected Fellow of the Royal Society (FRS) in 2019 for substantial contributions to the improvement of natural knowledge.
