= André Danthine =

Belgian computer scientist (1932–2024)

André Danthine (14 May 1932 – 18 January 2024) was a Belgian computer scientist. He was a professor of computer science at the University of Liège from 1967 to 1997; and later a professor emeritus there. He specialised in computer networks and created the university's Research Unit in Networking in 1972.

In 2000, Danthine won the SIGCOMM Award "for basic contributions to protocol design & modelling and for leadership in the development of computer networking in Europe".

Danthine died on 18 January 2024, at the age 91.
