= Jim Kurose =

American computer scientist

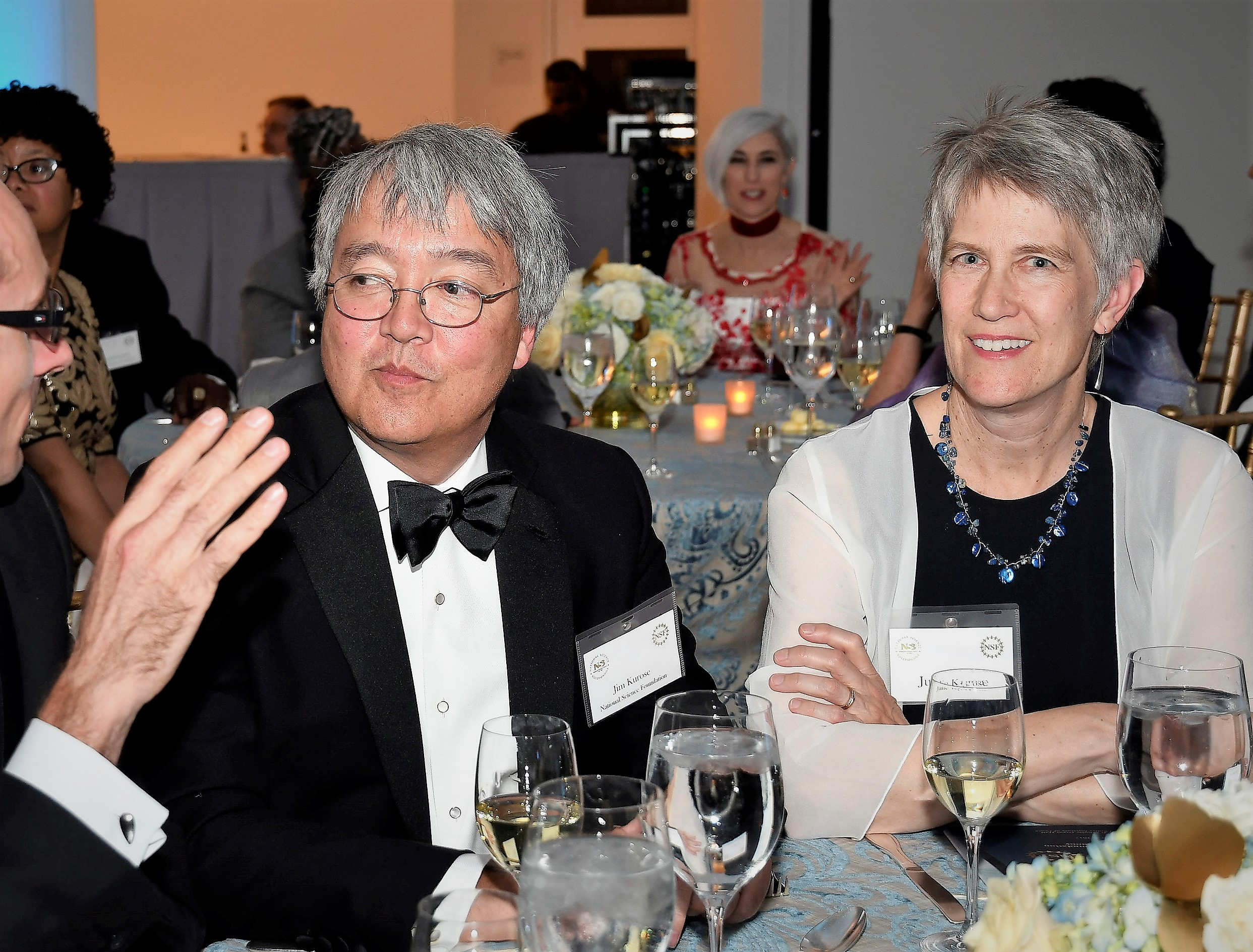
Kurose and wife Julie at National Science Board May 2017 Awards Ceremony

Jim Kurose (born 1956) is a Distinguished University Professor in the College of Information and Computer Sciences at the University of Massachusetts Amherst.

He was born in Greenwich, Connecticut, USA. He received his B.A. degree from Wesleyan University (physics) and, in 1984, his Ph.D. degree from Columbia University (computer science). Kurose's main area of teaching is computer networking. In 2020, he was elected a member of the National Academy of Engineering for contributions to the design and analysis of network protocols for multimedia communication.

== Book ==
He is famous for co‑authoring the widely used textbook Computer Networking: A Top‑Down Approach, one of the most influential introductory works in the field of computer networks.

== Career ==
Kurose became a faculty member of Computer Science in University of Massachusetts Amherst after he finished his doctoral degree in 1984. Kurose was a visiting scientist at the University Paris, Institut Eurecom, INRIA, Technicolor and IBM Research. He has been a member of the Scientific Council of Institute IMDEA Networks since 2007, and a member of the Board of Directors of the Computing Research Association.

Since January 2015, Dr. Kurose has been on leave from the University of Massachusetts, serving as the Assistant Director of the National Science Foundation (NSF) for Computer and Information Science and Engineering (CISE). He leads the CISE Directorate, with an annual budget of more than $900 million. Dr. Kurose also serves as co-chair of the Networking and Information Technology Research and Development Subcommittee of the National Science and Technology Council Committee on Technology, facilitating the coordination of networking and information technology research and development efforts across federal agencies.

== Awards ==
Dr. Kurose has received the following awards:

- IEEE fellow in the year 1997 for contributions to the design of real-time communication protocols.
- Taylor Booth Award of the IEEE in 2001
- IEEE Communications Society INFOCOM 2013 Achievement Award
- ACM Sigcomm Special Interest Group (SIG) Lifetime achievement award in 2016
