= IMDEA Networks Institute =

Spanish scientific research organization

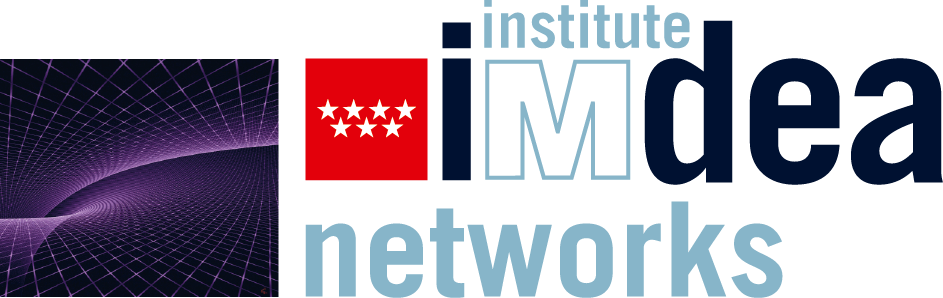
- Founded: 2006
- Purpose: Research
- Location: Leganés, Madrid, Spain
- Key people: Albert Banchs, Director; Pablo Serrano, Deputy Director; Ralf Steinmetz, President of the Board of Trustees
- Website: www.networks.imdea.org

IMDEA Networks Institute is one of the seven IMDEA (Spanish pronunciation: [inˈde.a]) Institutes created by the Madrid Regional Government as part of the IV Regional Plan of Scientific Research and Technological Innovation 2005-2008 (PRICIT), of which the aim is to put in place advanced research centers and higher education and training in the Community of Madrid. IMDEA Networks Institute is engaged in science in all areas of networking. It was legally constituted under Spanish law at the end of 2006 as a public, not-for-profit Foundation. The full, registered name of the institute is Fundación IMDEA Networks. IMDEA Networks Institute, based in Madrid (Spain), actively collaborates with the Higher Polytechnic School of Universidad Carlos III de Madrid.

== Organization ==
The Board of Trustees of IMDEA Networks Institute is its highest organ of governance, representation and administration. It consists of representative bodies from the public and private sector with an interest in the institute. Within the organizational structure of the Institute there is also a Scientific Council, or Scientific Advisory Board, composed of internationally renowned researchers in the areas of knowledge where the foundation is focused.

== Research ==
IMDEA Networks Institute is working in the field of communication networks, aiming to develop pioneering ideas that help shape the future of networking over the coming years. Researchers at IMDEA Networks study the emergent properties of today's networks in order to be able to improve the algorithms and protocols that allow these networks to operate. Computer networking research consists of creating mathematical models as well as validating theories through simulations and measurements in test beds and/or real-world deployments. Currently, the institute's research is focusing on the following three general areas:

- Network Design and Intelligence
- Wireless Communication and Sensing
- Network Measurements, Cybersecurity and Privacy

== Objectives ==
According to its statutes, the mission of IMDEA Networks Institute is "to provide new research capacities, technological development and innovation" in the fields of networking technologies and telematic and telecommunication services.
