= SIGCOMM =

Subgroup of the Association for Computing Machinery

SIGCOMM is the Association for Computing Machinery's Special Interest Group on Data Communications, which specializes in the field of communication and computer networks. It is also the name of an annual 'flagship' conference, organized by SIGCOMM, which is considered to be the leading conference in data communications and networking in the world. Known to have an extremely low acceptance rate (~10%), many of the landmark works in Networking and Communications have been published through it.

Of late, a number of workshops related to networking are also co-located with the SIGCOMM conference. These include Workshop on Challenged Networks (CHANTS), Internet Network Management (INM), Large Scale Attack Defense (LSAD) and Mining Network Data (MineNet).

SIGCOMM also produces a quarterly magazine, Computer Communication Review, with both peer-reviewed and editorial (non-peer reviewed) content, and a bi-monthly refereed journal IEEE/ACM Transactions on Networking, co-sponsored with IEEE.

SIGCOMM hands out the following awards on an annual basis

- The SIGCOMM Award, for outstanding lifetime technical achievement in the fields of data and computer communications
- The Rising Star Award, for a young research under the age of 35 who has made outstanding contributions during this early part of their career.
- The Test of Time Award recognizes papers published 10 to 12 years in the past in a SIGCOMM sponsored or co-sponsored venue whose contents still represent a vibrant, useful contribution.
- Best Paper Award and the Best Student Paper Award at that year's conference.
- The SIGCOMM Doctoral Dissertation Award recognizes excellent thesis research by doctoral candidates in the field of computer networking and data communication.
- The SIGCOMM Networking Systems Award recognizes the development of a networking system that has had a significant impact on the world of computer networking.
