= History of email =

The history of email entails an evolving set of technologies and standards that culminated in the email systems in use today.

Computer-based messaging between users of the same system became possible following the advent of time-sharing in the early 1960s, with a notable implementation by MIT's CTSS project in 1965. Informal methods of using shared files to pass messages were soon expanded into the first mail systems. Most developers of early mainframes and minicomputers developed similar, but generally incompatible, mail applications. Over time, a complex web of gateways and routing systems linked many of them. Some systems also supported a form of instant messaging, where sender and receiver needed to be online simultaneously.

In 1971, Ray Tomlinson sent the first mail message between two computers on the ARPANET, introducing the now-familiar address syntax with the '@' symbol designating the user's system address. Over a series of RFCs, conventions were refined for sending mail messages over the File Transfer Protocol. Several other email networks developed in the 1970s and expanded subsequently.

Proprietary electronic mail systems began to emerge in the 1970s and early 1980s. IBM developed a primitive in-house solution for office automation over the period 1970–1972, and replaced it with OFS (Office System), providing mail transfer between individuals, in 1974. This system developed into IBM Profs, which was available on request to customers before being released commercially in 1981. CompuServe began offering electronic mail designed for intraoffice memos in 1978. The development team for the Xerox Star began using electronic mail in the late 1970s. Development work on DEC's ALL-IN-1 system began in 1977 and was released in 1982. Hewlett-Packard launched HPMAIL (later HP DeskManager) in 1982, which became the world's largest selling email system.

The Simple Mail Transfer Protocol (SMTP) protocol was implemented on the ARPANET in 1983. LAN email systems emerged in the mid-1980s. For a time in the late 1980s and early 1990s, it seemed likely that either a proprietary commercial system or the X.400 email system, part of the Government Open Systems Interconnection Profile (GOSIP), would predominate. However, a combination of factors made the current Internet suite of SMTP, POP3 and IMAP email protocols the standard (see Protocol Wars).

During the 1980s and 1990s, use of email became common in business, government, universities, and defense/military industries. Starting with the advent of webmail (the web-era form of email) and email clients in the mid-1990s, use of email began to extend to the rest of the public. By the 2000s, email had gained ubiquitous status. The popularity of smartphones since the 2010s has enabled instant access to emails.

== Precursors ==
The first electrical transmission of messages began in the 19th century in the form of the electrical telegraph, which started to replace earlier forms of telegraphy from the 1840s in the United Kingdom and the United States.

Telex became an operational teleprinter service in 1933, beginning in Germany and Europe, and after 1945 spread around the world.

The AUTODIN military network in the United States, first operational in 1962, provided a message service between 1,350 terminals, handling 30 million messages per month, with an average message length of approximately 3,000 characters. By 1968, AUTODIN linked more than 300 sites in several countries.

== Terminology and usage ==
The term mail in the context of messages between computer users has been in use since the 1960s. In RFCs relating to the ARPANET, network mail was used since 1973.

Historically, the term electronic mail is any electronic document transmission. For example, several writers in the early 1970s used the term to refer to fax document transmission. The Oxford English Dictionary (OED) has a first quotation for electronic mail in the modern context in 1975. Electronic mail was widely discussed in the late 1970s, but was usually shortened simply to mail. In September 1976, a Business Week article entitled When interoffice mail goes electronic remarked "In a sense, electronic mail is not new".

The OED provides a June 1979 first usage for E-mail: "Postal Service pushes ahead with E-mail" in the journal Electronics. No earlier usage has been found; although, the first usage of the term e-mail may be lost. CompuServe rebranded its electronic mail service as EMAIL in April 1981, which popularized the term. The term computer mail was also used in the early 1980s.

The June 1979 usage of E-mail referred to the United States Postal Service (USPS) project called Electronic Computer Originated Mail, which they abbreviated E-COM. USPS began looking into electronic mail in 1977 resulting in the E-COM proposal in September 1978. The service launched in 1982, allowing corporate customers to send electronic mail to a post office branch from where it was printed and delivered in the normal way. It operated until 1985.

== Host-based mail systems ==
With the introduction of MIT's Compatible Time-Sharing System (CTSS) in 1961, for the first time multiple users could log into a central system (Note: an IBM 7094) from remote terminals, and store and share files on the central disk. Informal methods of using such shared files to pass messages were soon developed and expanded into the first mail systems.

- 1962
  - The 1440/1460 Administrative Terminal System was able to exchange messages between terminals.
- 1965
  - MIT's CTSS "MAIL" command was proposed by Pat Crisman, Glenda Schroeder, and Louis Pouzin, then implemented by Tom Van Vleck and Noel Morris. Each user's messages would be added to a local file called "MAIL BOX", which would have a "private" mode so that only the owner could read or delete messages. The proposed uses of the system were for communication from CTSS to notify users that files had been backed up, discussion between authors of CTSS commands, and communication from command authors to the CTSS manual editor. Developers of other early systems subsequently developed similar mail applications.
- 1968
  - ATS/360.
- 1971
  - SNDMSG, a local inter-user mail program developed by Ray Tomlinson, incorporating the experimental file transfer program, CPYNET, allowed the first networked electronic mail over the ARPANET. The addresses contained the '@' character as a separator between local part and host. This was the first message transfer agent (MTA).
- 1972
  - The Unix mail program enabled users to write mails and send them to mailboxes of other Unix users. Furthermore, it helped managing the mailbox of the current user.
  - APL Mailbox, by Larry Breed of STSC, aimed at being a more robust mail software than a predecessor written in 1971.
  - IBM developed a primitive in-house system for office automation over the period 1970–1972.
- 1973
  - 666 BOX, by Leslie Goldsmith of I. P. Sharp Associates, a reimplementation of APL Mailbox.
- 1974
  - August - The PLATO IV Notes on-line message board system was generalized to offer "personal notes".
  - October - IBM OFS (Office System), proving mail transfer between individuals, was first installed as a replacement for their earlier in-house office automation system.
- 1978
  - CompuServe offered electronic mail, designed primarily for intraoffice memos, as part of their corporate Infoplex service.
  - Mail client written by Kurt Shoens for Unix and distributed with the Second Berkeley Software Distribution included support for aliases and distribution lists, forwarding, formatting messages, and accessing different mailboxes. It used the Unix mail client to send messages between system users. The concept was extended to communicate remotely over the Berkeley Network.
  - Computerized Bulletin Board System (CBBS) was a public dial-up BBS.
- 1979
  - ARPANET delivermail was shipped with 4BSD.
  - MH Message Handling System developed at The RAND Corporation provided several tools for managing electronic mail on Unix.
  - September 24 - CompuServe launched a dialup service labelled MicroNET which offered electronic mail.
- 1980
  - July - Minitel experimental service launched in France, enabled users to have a mail box. Introduced commercially throughout France in 1982.
  - Wang Laboratories introduced its Integrated Information Systems line, incorporating the ability to attach digitised voice messages.
- 1981
  - April 1 - CompuServe rebranded its electronic mail service as EMAIL. A US trademark application (USPTO SN:73432146) was filed on June 27, 1983, but abandoned in August 1984.
  - IBM PROFS, the predecessor of OfficeVision/VM, is released, incorporating a centralised virtual machine to manage mail transfer between individuals. Before that it was a PRPQ (Programming Request for Price Quotation), an IBM administrative term for non-standard software offerings with unique features, support and pricing.By this year it had 500 users.
- 1982
  - April - HPMAIL by Hewlett-Packard went on sale. Later developed into HP DeskManager, this became the world's largest selling email system.
  - May - ALL-IN-1 by Digital Equipment Corporation, an office automation system including functionality in electronic messaging, was released. Development work began in 1977. In-house electronic mail was in use at DEC prior to the commercial release of ALL-IN-1.
- 1983
  - April - sendmail, one of the first MTA to implement Simple Mail Transfer Protocol (SMTP), is shipped with 4.1cBSD.
- 1984
  - FidoNet is released, creating a network of connected email-accepting and -forwarding bulletin boards.
  - Prestel Mailbox service launched, offering private messaging, on the UK Viewdata service. The Duke of Edinburgh's account would be hacked within months of launch; the resulting legal case helped to define computer misuse laws in the UK and around the world.
- 1994
  - Mar 9 - PTG MAIL-DAEMON, the first experimental Webmail services, is made available at CERN, by Phillip Hallam-Baker.

== Email networks ==
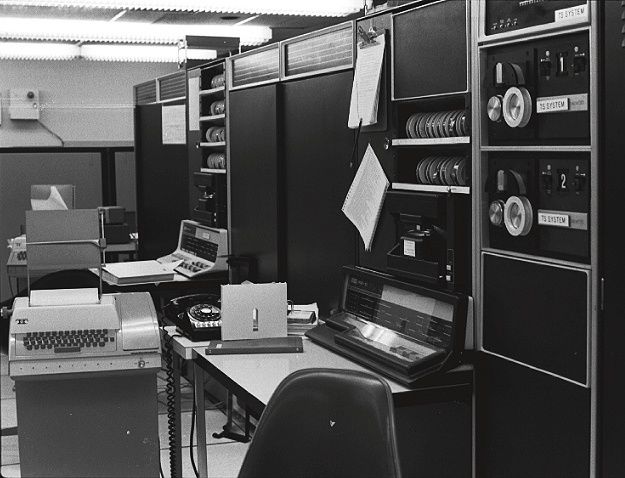
The first electronic message was sent between these two adjacent PDP-10 computers at BBN Technologies in 1971, connected only through the ARPANET.

To facilitate electronic mail exchange between remote sites and with other organizations, telecommunication links, such as dialup modems or leased lines, provided means to transport email globally, creating local and global networks. This was challenging for a number of reasons, including the widely different email address formats in use.

- In 1971 the first message was sent between two computers on the ARPANET. Through RFC 561, RFC 680, RFC 724, and finally 1977's RFC 733, this became a standardized working system based on the File Transfer Protocol (FTP).
- PLATO IV was networked to individual terminals over leased data lines prior to the implementation of personal notes in 1974.
- IBM VNET was deployed by 1975, using BSC to communicate among CP-67 and VM hosts running RSCS.
- Unix mail was networked by 1978's UUCP, which was also used for USENET newsgroup postings, with similar headers.
- BerkNet, the Berkeley Network, was written by Eric Schmidt in 1978 and included first in the Second Berkeley Software Distribution. It provided support for sending and receiving messages over serial communication links. The Unix mail tool was extended to send messages using Berknet.
- Telenet's Telemail.
- Tymnet's OnTyme.
- BITNET (1981) provided electronic mail services for educational institutions. It was based on the IBM VNET email system.
- 1983 – MCI Mail Operated by MCI Communications Corporation.
- 1983 - EasyLink Operated by Western Union. Provided email as well as the ability to send a Telex, Mailgram (electronically printed message delivered in an envelope by the US Postal Service) and broadcast faxes to a pre-stored list. At the time it was considered a competitor to MCI Mail, but its primary audience was businesses, not consumers.
- In 1984, IBM PCs running DOS could link with FidoNet for email and shared bulletin board posting.
- Several companies established electronic mail services in the United Kingdom during the 1970s and early 1980s, enabling subscribers to send email either internally within a company network or over telephone connections or data networks such as Packet Switch Stream.

== Attempts at interoperability ==
Design issues in the development of international computer mail protocols were explored in the early 1980s. Early interoperability among independent systems included:

- The Coloured Book protocols, which ran on academic networks in the United Kingdom from 1975 until 1992 and gained some acceptance internationally as "interim" standards.
- UUCP implementations for Unix systems, initially released in 1979, and later for other operating systems, that only had dial-up communications available.
- The delivermail tool, written by Eric Allman in 1979 and 1980 (and shipped in 4BSD), provided support for routing mail over dissimilar networks, including Arpanet, UUCP, and BerkNet. (It also provided support for mail user aliases.)
- The mail client included in 4BSD (1980) was extended to provide interoperability between a variety of mail systems.
- CSNET, which began operation in 1981, initially used a purpose-built dial-up protocol, called Phonenet, to provide mail-relay services for non-ARPANET hosts.
- The Simple Mail Transfer Protocol (SMTP) protocol was implemented in 1983. It was first proposed by Jon Postel and Suzanne Sluizer in September 1980.
- X.400, published in 1984, was promoted by major vendors, and mandated for government use under GOSIP, but abandoned by all but a few in favor of Internet protocol suite's SMTP by the mid-1990s (see Protocol Wars).
- Soft-Switch released its eponymous email gateway product in 1984, acquired by Lotus Development ten years later.
- Message Handling System (MHS) protocol developed in 1986. Developed by Action Technologies, this was later bought and promoted by Novell. However they abandoned it after purchasing the non-MHS WordPerfect Office—which they renamed GroupWise.
- HP OpenMail, initially designed in 1987, was known for its ability to interconnect several other APIs and protocols, including MAPI, cc:Mail, SMTP/MIME, and X.400.
- MCI Mail was the first commercial public email service to use the Internet in 1989.

== LAN email systems ==
In May 1979, Xerox ran a television advertisement for its 1973 Xerox Alto system, demonstrating the 1978 Distributed Message System (DMS) client, known as Laurel, to the US public. An application Xerox described as replacing Xerox's earlier MSG client for its MAXC document distribution system. In 1981, the Xerox Star went on sale, offering a commercial variant of the Xerox Alto's multi-user virtual office, including computer mail. The Star had been in development since 1977 and the development team relied heavily on the technologies they were working on, including electronic mail.

In the 1980s, networked personal computers on LANs became increasingly important. By 1987 users of Microsoft's internal MS-Net network of about 1600 computers, workstations, and terminals sent 60,000 megabytes of email weekly via Xenix systems. As of 1993 the Xenix mail systems handled 650,000-750,000 messages daily, 4.5GB total or about 30-35 per user, 10-15% to or from outside the company. Server-based systems similar to the earlier mainframe systems were developed. Examples include:

- cc:Mail
- LANtastic
- Banyan VINES (1984)
- Microsoft Mail (1988)
- WordPerfect Office (1988), later rebranded Novell GroupWise
- Lotus Notes (1989)

Eventually these systems could link different organizations as long as each organization ran the same email system and proprietary protocol. Various vendors supplied gateway software to link these incompatible systems.

== ARPANET mail ==
=== Mail protocol proposal ===
A "Mail Protocol" was proposed by Richard Watson at the Network Information Center's (NIC), hosted by SRI-ARC, in RFC 196 in July 1971. This proposal was revised and updated in RFC 221, 278 in August and November 1971, respectively. However, the protocol was not implemented on the ARPANET.

=== Network mail using FTP ===
In August 1971, Ray Tomlinson, of BBN, updated an existing utility called SNDMSG so that it could copy messages (as files) over the network. He sent the first message across the network in 1971, initiating the use of the "@" sign to separate the names of the user and the user's machine. His message was sent from one Digital Equipment Corporation PDP-10 computer to another PDP-10. The two machines were placed next to each other. In effect, SNDMSG was the first mail transport agent (MTA).

In July 1972, Abhay Bhusan, a professor at MIT, was writing the final specs of the ARPANET File Transfer Protocol (FTP). Upon the suggestion of his colleagues, he added Tomlinson's programs to the final product. Two FTP commands, MAIL and MLFL, permitted an FTP user process to deliver a file or string of text to an FTP server process, designating it as mail to be made available to a user, identified by a local name, in its host.

In the same month, Lawrence Roberts, the project manager for the ARPANET development, took the idea of READMAIL, which dumped all "recent" messages onto the user's terminal, and wrote a program for TENEX in TECO macros called RD, which permitted access to individual messages. Barry Wessler then updated RD and called it NRD.

Marty Yonke rewrote NRD to include reading, access to SNDMSG for sending, and a help system, and called the utility WRD, which was later known as BANANARD. John Vittal then updated this version to include three important commands: Move (combined save/delete command), Answer (determined to whom a reply should be sent) and Forward (sent a message to a person who was not already a recipient). The system was called MSG. With inclusion of these features, MSG is considered to be the first integrated modern electronic mail program, from which many other applications have descended.

Improvements to the use of the File Transfer Protocol (FTP) for "network mail" were discussed in March 1973.

An ARPA study in 1973, a year after network email was introduced to the ARPANET community, found that three-quarters of the traffic over the ARPANET consisted of email messages.

Another "Mail Protocol" was proposed by Jim White of SRI-ARC in RFC 524 in June 1973. This drew criticism from Dave Crocker and Jon Postel and was not implemented.

Through RFC 561, RFC 680, RFC 724, and finally RFC 733 in November 1977, a standardized framework was developed for "electronic mail", also called "network text messages", using FTP mail servers on the ARPANET.

Delivermail was introduced in 1979 to replace SNDMSG as an MTA, i.e. mail server, using FTP to transmit messages to the recipient.

=== Email addressing across networks ===
Initially, addresses on the ARPANET were of the form, username@hostname. As other networks developed, gateways were implemented to pass mail to and from networks such as UUCP, CSNET, JANET, BITNET, X.400, and FidoNet. This often involved addresses such as:

hubhost!middlehost!edgehost!user@uucpgateway.somedomain.example.com

which routes mail to a user with a "bang path" address at a UUCP host.

== Internet email ==
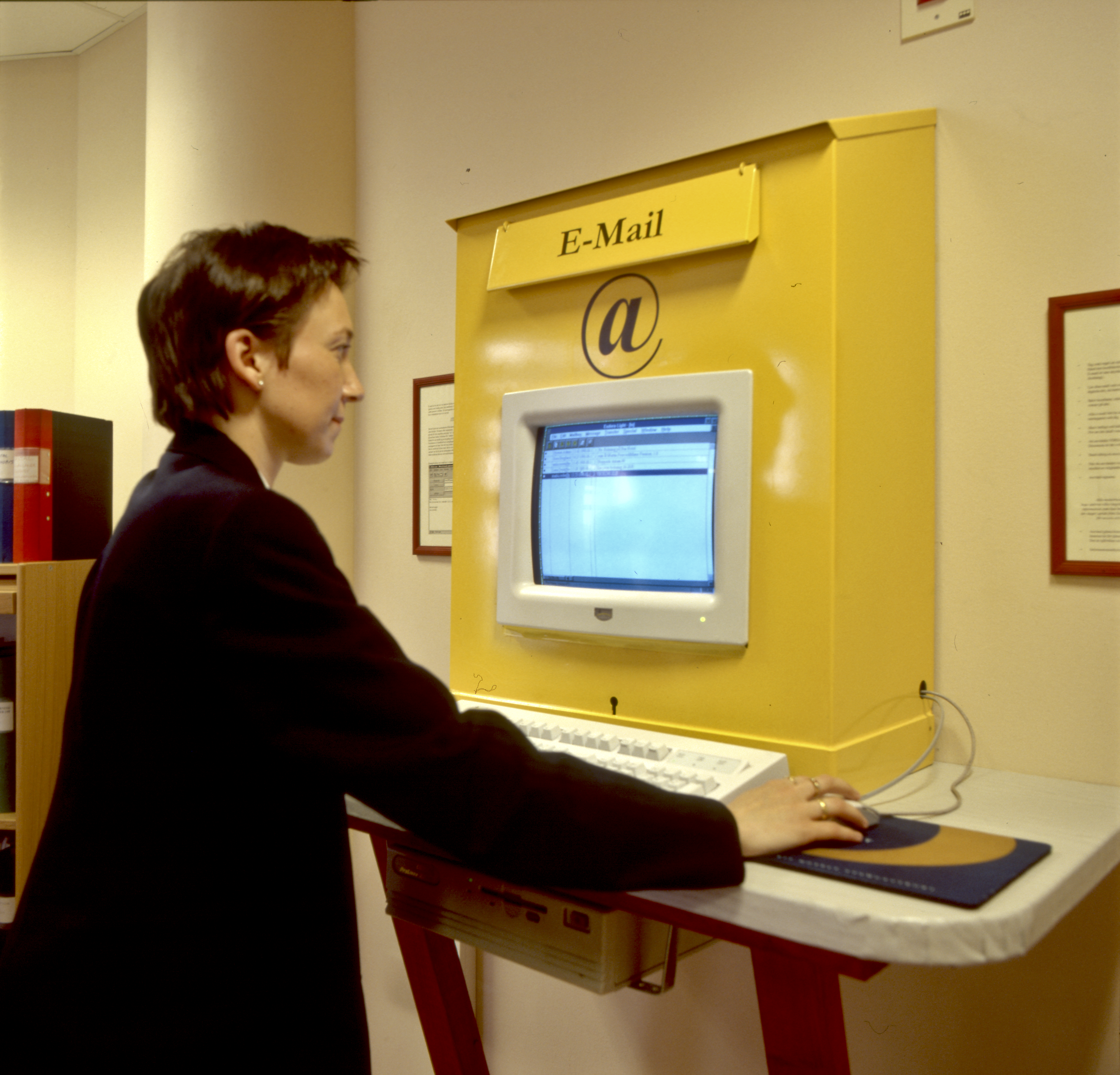
Computer intended for email in Lund, Sweden, 1998.

=== Initial proposals ===
Ray Tomlinson proposed a network mail protocol to the International Network Working Group in INWG Protocol note 2, written in September 1974. Subsequently, Derek Barber implemented a network mail protocol on the EIN, which he presented to INWG in February 1979. This was referenced by Jon Postel in his March 1979 work on an "Internet Message Protocol" in Internet Experiment Note (IEN) number 85, which was RFC 753. Postel published a second draft in August 1980 as IEN113/RFC 759.

=== SMTP ===
In September 1980, Postel and Suzanne Sluizer published RFC 772 which proposed the Mail Transfer Protocol (MTP) to enable servers to transmit "computer mail" on the ARPANET as a replacement for FTP. Following this, RFC 780 of May 1981 removed all references to FTP.

In November 1981, Postel published RFC 788 describing the Simple Mail Transfer Protocol (SMTP) protocol, which was updated by RFC 821 in August 1982. Addresses were extended to username@host.domain by RFC 805 in February 1982. RFC 822, written by Dave Crocker, defined the format for messages.

ARPANET switched to TCP/IP on January 1, 1983 and the Internet grew rapidly thereafter (see Protocol Wars). A new mail transfer agent (MTA) based on SMTP, Sendmail, was introduced in 1983. SMTP use continued to grow on the Internet.

After the introduction of the Domain Name System (DNS) in 1985, mail routing was updated in January 1986 by RFC 974.

=== POP and IMAP ===
The Internet community developed two further standards, the Post Office Protocol (POP) and the Internet Message Access Protocol (IMAP), in 1984 and 1988 respectively. POP and IMAP enabled connections with remote e-mail servers that contain users’ mailboxes.

=== Email clients ===
During the 1980s and 1990s, use of email became common in business, government, universities, and defense/military industries. Starting with the advent of webmail (the web-era form of email) and email clients in the mid-1990s, use of email began to extend to the rest of the public. By the 2000s, email had gained ubiquitous status. The popularity of smartphones since the 2010s has enabled instant access to emails.

=== Mail servers ===
Many providers of mail server software emerged in the 1980s with various features.

== Notable first uses of email ==
- Ray Tomlinson is generally recognized as sending the first electronic mail, between two different computers on the ARPANET, in 1971. Tomlinson has been called "the inventor of modern email".
- Sylvia Wilbur, who worked for Peter Kirstein at University College London, was "probably one of the first people in [the United Kingdom] ever to send an email [over the ARPANET], back in 1974".
- Queen Elizabeth II sent the first electronic mail from a head of state over the ARPANET from the Royal Signals and Radar Establishment in England on March 26, 1976.
- Jimmy Carter's presidential campaign became the first to use electronic mail for internal communications in the autumn of 1976.
- The first UUCP emails from the U.S. arrived in the UK in 1979 and UUCP email between the UK, the Netherlands and Denmark started in 1980, becoming a regular service via EUnet in 1982, which expanded coverage to Sweden and later France, Germany, Switzerland and other countries in Europe.
- IBM PROFS email was used by the U.S. National Security Council under President Ronald Reagan in the 1980s.
- The first Internet email sent to Germany via CSNET was from Laura Breeden to Michael Rotert and Werner Zorn as a carbon copy at the Technical University of Karlsruhe (today Karlsruhe Institute of Technology) on August 3, 1984.
- The first email sent from outer space was August 9, 1991, Space Shuttle mission STS-43.
- Bill Clinton was the first U.S. president to use Internet email in the 1990s, including a reply to an email from the prime minister of Sweden in 1994.

== See also ==
- History of email spam
- History of email marketing
- History of Gmail
