= SNDMSG =

Early electronic mail program

SNDMSG was an early electronic mail program, chiefly notable because it was used to send what is considered the first networked email.

SNDMSG was originally the electronic mail program for a single multi-user time-sharing computer running the TENEX operating system. It allowed all users of the machine to send a simple form of email to each other. The program was extended by Ray Tomlinson in 1971 to allow sending to users on other computers accessible over the ARPANET, using the then introduced FTP Mail command and addressing them by appending the other system's host name after an "@" sign.

SNDMSG along with READMAIL were the key components of networked mail on TENEX.

== See also ==
- Delivermail
- History of email
- Sendmail
