= Sendmail, Inc. =

American e-mail software company

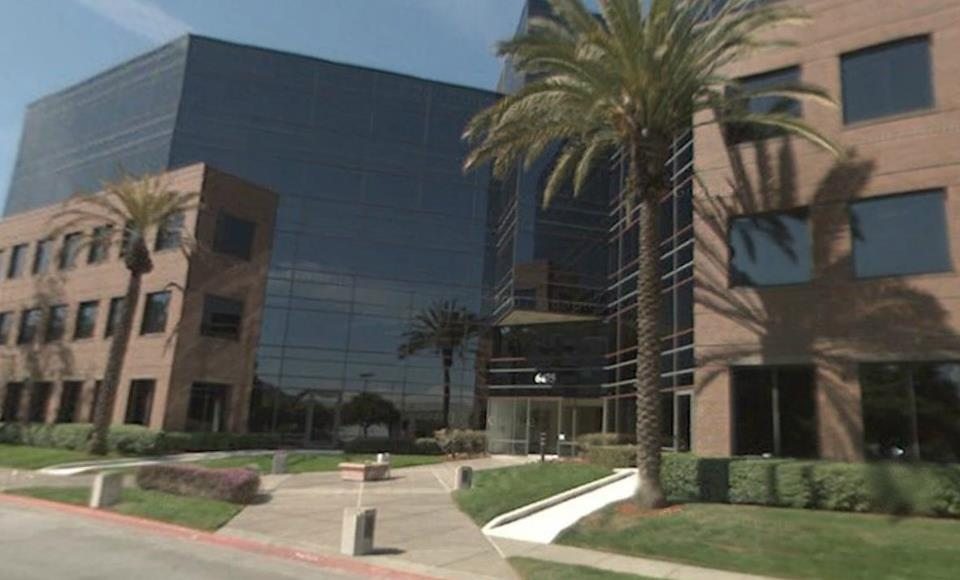
- Sendmail Headquarters
- Type: Subsidiary of Proofpoint, Inc.
- Industry: Email Management
- Founded: 1998; 28 years ago
- Headquarters: Emeryville, California
- Key people: Glen D. Vondrick (President & CEO); Gregory Shapiro (VP, Cloud Enablement) & CTO
- Parent: Proofpoint, Inc.
- Website: Sendmail, Inc. (Archived March 6, 2017, at the Wayback Machine)

Sendmail, Inc. is an email management business.

The company is headquartered in Emeryville, CA with offices throughout the Americas, Europe and Asia. The company was acquired in 2013 by Proofpoint, Inc.

== History ==
The company was founded in 1999 by Eric Allman in Emeryville, CA. Eric also created sendmail, an open source mail transfer agent while he was a student and a staff member at the University of California, Berkeley. It is the commercial version of the open source version of sendmail.

=== Managing Email ===
In 2005, Sendmail released the Sentrion email infrastructure platform to address the need for full-content message inspection, enabling policy-based delivery of all human and machine-generated email.

=== Hybrid Cloud ===
In 2012, Sendmail partnered with Mimecast to provide hybrid-cloud email security, archiving and continuity as some predicted that 2013 would see more organizations implementing hybrid cloud computing strategies to reduce cost and complexity of their messaging infrastructure.

=== Machine-Generated Email ===
In 2012, Sendmail released Sentrion REAC (Rogue Email Application Control) amid growing security, compliance and other concerns posed by the growth of application-generated email and migration of email to the cloud.

=== Acquired by Proofpoint ===
In 2013, Sendmail was acquired by security-as-a-service company Proofpoint, Inc. for $23 million.

== Product timeline ==
1998
Released Switch, the commercial MTA
2000
Released Sendmail Milter API
2001
Released Mailstream Manager for email security and compliant policy management
2003
Released Mailcenter for the enterprise
2005
Shipped first Sentrion™ appliance
2006
Celebrated 25th anniversary of internet email (MTA)
2007
Shipped Sentrion MP ‘inbound & outbound’ Appliance
2008
Released Sentrion MPV and Sentrion™ MPQ
2009
Released Sentrion Cloud Services (SaaS)
2010
Opened Sentrion App Store (www.SentrionAppStore.com)
2011
Sendmail teams with Harris and BMC on trusted enterprise cloud
2011
Released Sentrion Critical Customer Communications Enterprise Application Suite
2012
Released Sentrion REAC (Rogue Email Application Control)
