= Logger =

Logger may refer to:

- Lumberjack, a woodcutter, a person who harvests lumber
- Data logger, software or an electronic device that records sequential data to a log file
- Keystroke logger, software that records the keys struck on a computer keyboard
- logger, a command line utility that can send messages to the syslog

== See also ==
- Logbook
- Logging
- Lager—beer
