= JANET NRS =

UK academic research naming scheme

The JANET NRS (Name Registration Scheme) was a pseudo-hierarchical naming scheme used on British academic and research networks in the 1980s. Its purpose was to organise and manage domain names within the JANET network, contributing to the establishment of computer networking familiarities at universities in the United Kingdom and other academic and research institutions. It used a reverse domain name notation.

== History ==
It was proposed in 1983 and used until the superficially similar Internet Domain Name System (DNS) was fully adopted.

== Purpose and structure ==
The JANET NRS was developed to allocate and maintain unique domain names for organisations connected to the JANET network. Its primary purpose was to ensure a standardised and organised approach to domain name registration, facilitating identification and differentiation of institutions and their computer resources on the network.

NRS "second-level domains" consisted of UK.AC (JANET academic and scientific sites), UK.CO (commercial) and UK.MOD (Ministry of Defence). Any organisations not falling into these categories were given their own "second-level" name, e.g. UK.BL (British Library) or UK.NEL (National Engineering Laboratory).

All NRS names had both a standard (long) and abbreviated (up to 18 characters) form. For example, UK.AC.CAMBRIDGE was the less widely used standard equivalent of the abbreviated name UK.AC.CAM.

For email, interoperability between the "Grey Book" email addressing style of user@UK.AC.SITE and ARPA and USENET addresses of the style user@site.ac.uk was achieved by way of mail gateway at University College London.

== Comparison with DNS ==
As Internet usage expanded and commercial entities emerged, the more general Domain Name System (DNS) superseded the NRS. A principal difference with the Domain Name System was that the order of significance began with the most significant part (so called big-endian addresses). Also, NRS names were canonically written in upper case. For example, the University of Cambridge had the NRS name UK.AC.CAM, whereas its DNS domain is cam.ac.uk.

After Internet top-level domains were introduced from 1984, confusion was caused when the least significant part of an Internet address matched the most significant part of an NRS address and vice versa. The ccTLD ".cs" for Czechoslovakia came into use around 1990-2 until 1995. The classic joke was that e-mail intended for UK universities ended up in Czechoslovakia, since many JANET e-mail addresses were of the form user@UK.AC.universityname.CS, where "CS" stood for Computer Science (department).

Another significant difference from the DNS was the concept of context to name lookups, e.g. 'mail' or 'file transfer'. This made the NRS more sophisticated than the DNS, permitting overloading of names.

== Legacy ==
JANET transitioned to using Internet protocols in 1991, and by 1994 the DNS had become the de facto standard for domain names on JANET. The final mail gateway was taken out of service by the end of 1997. Nonetheless, the JANET NRS remains a significant part of the history of network infrastructure and academic networking in the UK. The one remaining legacy of the NRS is the convention of using .uk for the Internet country code top-level domain (ccTLD), rather than .gb as specified by ISO 3166. The UK was the only country with a pre-existing national standard.

== See also ==
- Coloured Book protocols
- Internet in the United Kingdom § History
- Non-Internet email address
