= Rsyslog =

System log utility

- Original author: Rainer Gerhards
- Initial release: 2004
- Stable release: 8.2506.0 / 10 June 2025; 5 months ago
- Repository: github.com/rsyslog/rsyslog.git
- Written in: C
- Operating system: Unix-like
- Type: System logging
- License: GNU General Public License v3
- Website: www.rsyslog.com

Rsyslog is an open-source software utility used on UNIX and Unix-like computer systems for forwarding log messages in an IP network. It implements the basic syslog protocol, extends it with content-based filtering, rich filtering capabilities, queued operations to handle offline outputs, support for different module outputs, flexible configuration options and adds features such as using TCP for transport.

The official RSYSLOG website defines the utility as "the Rocket-fast SYStem for LOG processing pipelines".

== Protocol ==
Rsyslog uses the standard BSD syslog protocol, specified in RFC 3164. As the text of RFC 3164 is an informational description and not a standard, various incompatible extensions of it emerged. Rsyslog supports many of these extensions. The format of relayed messages can be customized.

The most important extensions of the original protocol supported by rsyslog are:

- ISO 8601 timestamp with millisecond granularity and time zone information
- the addition of the name of relays in the host fields to make it possible to track the path a given message has traversed
- reliable transport using TCP
- support GSS-API and TLS
- logging directly into various database engines.
- support for RFC 5424, RFC 5425, RFC 5426
- support for RELP
- support for buffered operation modes where messages are buffered locally if the receiver is not ready
- complete input/output support for systemd journal

== History ==
The rsyslog project began in 2004, when Rainer Gerhards, the primary author of rsyslog, decided to write a new strong syslog daemon to compete with syslog-ng, because, according to the author, "A new major player will prevent monocultures and provide a rich freedom of choice." Rainer Gerhards worked on rsyslog inside his own company, Adiscon GmbH.

== Related RFCs and working groups ==
- RFC 3164 - The BSD syslog Protocol (obsoleted by RFC 5424)
- RFC 5424 - The Syslog Protocol (obsoletes RFC 3164)
- RFC 5425 - Transport Layer Security Mapping for Syslog
- RFC 5426 - Transmission of Syslog Messages over UDP

== See also ==
- NXLog
- fluentd
- journald – incorporates syslog-like functionality
- syslog-ng
