= Eric Hahn =

American businessman and computer software programmer (b. 1960)

- Born: March 19, 1960 (age 66)
- Education: Worcester Polytechnic Institute
- Occupation: Business executive
- Known for: Founder of Collabra Software; Founder of Proofpoint, Inc; Co-founder of Lookout Software
- Children: 2

Eric Hahn (born March 19, 1960) is an American business executive who founded an early e-mail-based groupware company called Collabra Software in 1992. Netscape acquired Collabra in 1995, and in 1997 Hahn became Netscape's CTO.

== Education ==
Hahn received his bachelor's degree from Worcester Polytechnic Institute in 1980. He returned in 1999 to give the commencement address and receive an honorary doctorate.

== Career ==
Hahn founded Proofpoint, Inc in June 2002 which became a publicly traded company in April 2012, and later went back to a private company in 2021. He also co-founded Lookout Software, which was acquired by Microsoft in 2004.

== Personal life ==
Hahn and his wife, Elaine, live in Palo Alto, California, and they have two sons, Evan and Jeremy.
