= Non-Internet email address =

A wide variety of non-Internet email address formats were used in early email systems before the ubiquity of the john.smith@example.com form used by Internet mail systems since the 1980s – and a few are still used in specialised contexts.

== Single system ==
The earliest email addresses simply had to identify one user from another on one homogenous system, often a single host minicomputer or mainframe. They were therefore typically the user's login name on that system.

Examples of this style include:

- ATS: 123
- CompuServe: 432654,6564
- MCI Mail: 373-1994
- AOL: Steve Case

== At a host ==
As computer systems became networked email addresses needed to be able to identify not only the user, but also which host or mail system they were on. Addresses of this type were used in a number of early email systems, including:

- ARPANET: jim@washington
- IBM Network Job Entry (NJE)
  - TSO/E TRANSMIT: user_id, node.user_id, node/user_id, nickname, distribution list name, (addressee,...)
  - VM SENDFILE: userid, userid AT YOURNODE, userid AT node, nickname
- PROFS: userid@node
- DECnet: host::user (e.g. DECWRL::WRL-TECHREPORTS)
- cc:Mail: John Alexopoulos at MicroCircuits
- MHS: Barry@MICROSOFT

== Delivery path ==
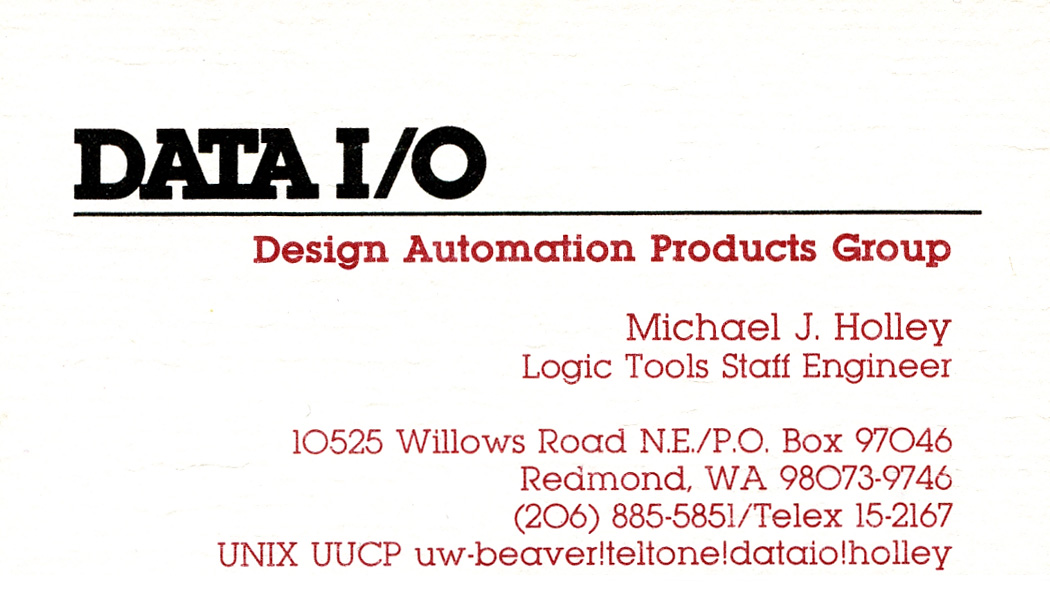
Example of a delivery path on a business card

Some email address schemes described the path through multiple hosts needed to deliver email. This worked well only if the first host given in the path was sufficiently well known for the sender's system to be able to contact it.

- UUCP "bang path": reed!percival!bucket!lisag

== Hierarchical ==
Hierarchical addressing schemes are naturally able to expand. The modern Internet email address (e.g. john.smith@example.com), is of this type – but it was also used by a number of early systems, including:

- Banyan VINES: Ed Hirsch@Faculty@Univ
- Grey Book: USERID@UK.AC.CAM.ENG
- FidoNET: lenz @ 2:331/113.1
- Lotus Notes: Tyler Hamilton/Sales@Europe

== Directory systems ==
In this type of system, there is no one unique address for a specific user, but instead a series of attributes, not all of which may be needed to identify the user. For convenience however, there may be recommended formats for sharing on business cards and similar contexts, such as:

- X.400: C=no;ADMD= ;PRMD=uninett;O=sintef;OU=delab;S=Alvestrand;G=Harald (Note: This is the "Labelled format" from RFC 1685.)

== See also ==
- Email address
- History of email
- Reverse domain name notation
- Protocol Wars
