= Msmtp =

Free and open-source SMTP client

msmtp
- Original author: Martin Lambers
- Initial release: 2003
- Stable release: 1.8.30 / 1 June 2025; 6 months ago
- Repository: github.com/marlam/msmtp-mirror
- Written in: C
- Operating system: Unix-like
- Available in: 9 languages
- List of languages English, Esperanto, French, German, Portuguese, Serbian, Swedish, Tamil, Ukrainian
- Type: Mail transfer agent
- License: GPLv3
- Website: marlam.de/msmtp/

msmtp is an SMTP client. It is free software, published under the GPLv3. msmtp is packaged by major Linux distributions and by FreeBSD. It can also be found bundled in Android applications.

msmtp is able to utilise email account passwords stored in Keychain on OS X, or in GNOME Keyring on computers using the GNOME desktop.

msmtp can be used in conjunction with OfflineIMAP. This allows the user to read email and draft replies offline, and to use msmtp to send the replies when back online.

== See also ==
- Sendmail
