= Eric Allman =

American computer programmer (born 1955)

Eric Paul Allman
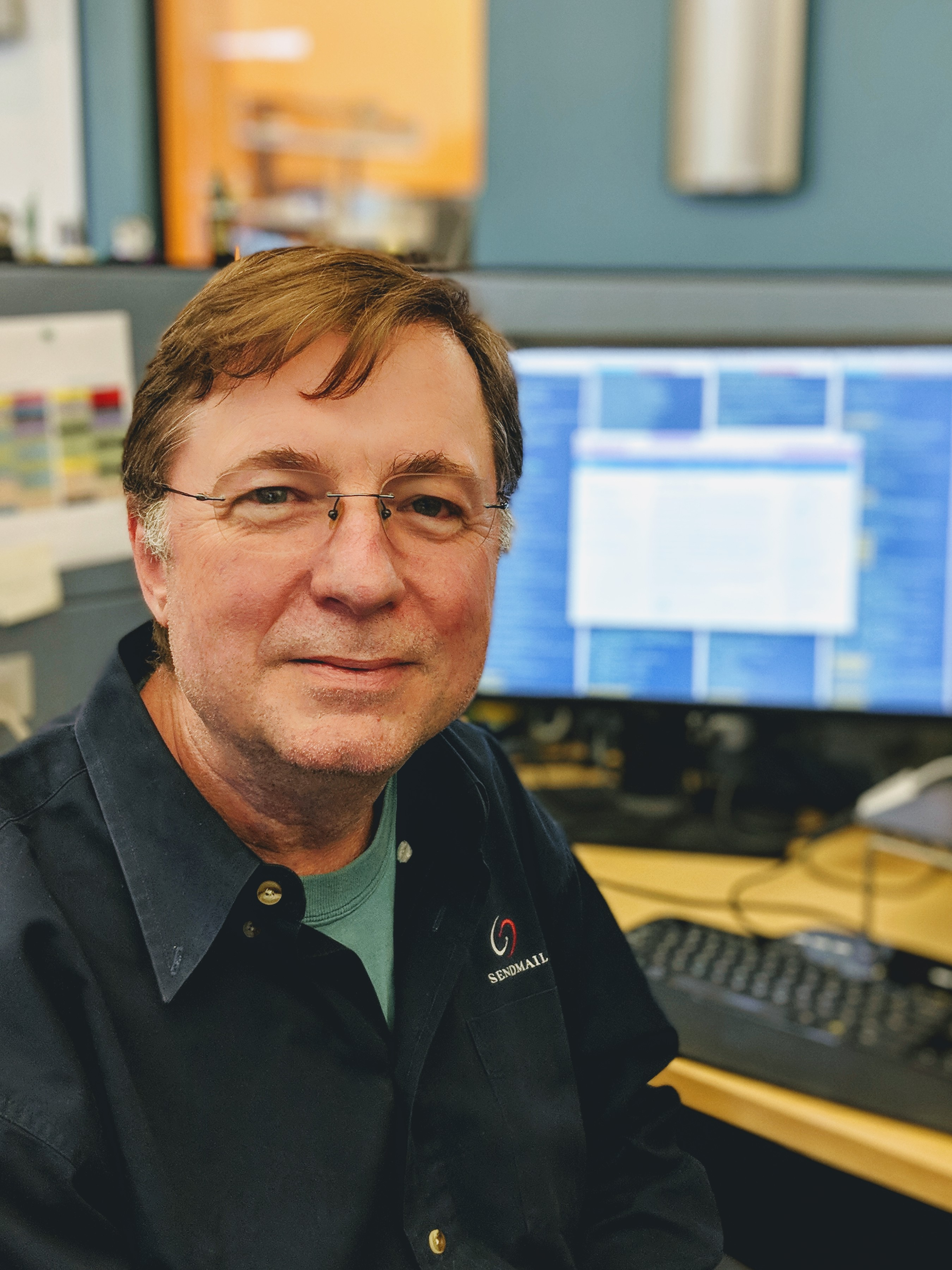
- Born: September 2, 1955 (age 71); El Cerrito, California, U.S.
- Education: University of California, Berkeley (BS, MS)
- Occupation: Programmer
- Employer: Sendmail
- Known for: Sendmail, Syslog
- Title: Chief Science Officer
- Spouse: Marshall Kirk McKusick

Eric Paul Allman (born September 2, 1955) is an American computer programmer who developed sendmail and its precursor delivermail in the late 1970s and early 1980s at UC Berkeley. In 1998, Allman and Greg Olson co-founded the company Sendmail, Inc.

== Education and training ==
Born in El Cerrito, California, Allman knew from an early age that he wanted to work in computing. He used to break into his high school's mainframe and later used the UC Berkeley computing center for his computing needs. In 1973, he entered UC Berkeley, just as the Unix operating system began to become popular in academic circles. He earned B.S. and M.S. degrees from UC Berkeley in 1977 and 1980 respectively.

== Sendmail and Syslog ==
As the Unix source code was available at Berkeley, the local hackers quickly made many extensions to the AT&T code. One such extension was delivermail, which in 1981 turned into sendmail. As an MTA, it was designed to deliver email over the still relatively small (as compared to today's Internet) ARPANET, which consisted of many smaller networks with vastly differing formats for e-mail headers.

Sendmail soon became an important part of the Berkeley Software Distribution (BSD) and it used to be the most widely used MTA on Unix based systems, despite its somewhat complex configuration syntax and frequent abuse by Internet telemarketing firms. In 1998, Allman and Greg Olson founded Sendmail, Inc., headquartered in Emeryville, California, to do proprietary work on improving sendmail.

The logging format used by the MTA, known as syslog, was at first used solely by sendmail, but eventually became an unofficial standard format used by other unrelated programs for logging. Later, this format was made official by RFC 3164 in 2001; however, the original format has been made obsolete by the most recent revision, RFC 5424.

== Other contributions ==
Allman is credited with popularizing the Allman indent style, also known as BSD indent style. He ported a Fortran version of Super Star Trek to the C programming language, which later became BSD Trek, and is still included in various Linux distributions as part of the classic bsdgames package.

He was awarded the Telluride Tech Festival Award of Technology in August, 2006 in Telluride, Colorado. In 2009, he was recognized as a Distinguished Engineer by the Association for Computing Machinery. In April 2014 he was inducted into the Internet Hall of Fame. He was named as an ACM Fellow, in the 2025 class of fellows, "for the development of electronic mail".

== Personal life ==
Allman, who is gay, lives in Berkeley, California, with Marshall Kirk McKusick, who had been his partner for more than 30 years before they got married in October 2013. The two first met in graduate school. McKusick is a lead developer of BSD.

There is some sort of perverse pleasure in knowing that it's basically impossible to send a piece of hate mail through the Internet without its being touched by a gay program. That's kind of funny.

— Eric Allman
