= Tom Van Vleck =

American software engineer

- Born: Thomas Van Vleck; Hinsdale, Illinois, U.S.
- Education: Massachusetts Institute of Technology (BS)
- Occupation: Software engineer
- Known for: Co-author of CTSS's first email program

Thomas Van Vleck is an American software engineer specializing in time-sharing and computer security. He is notable for co-authoring an early email program.

== Life and work ==
Thomas Van Vleck was born and grew up in Hinsdale, Illinois. He graduated from the Massachusetts Institute of Technology (MIT) in 1965 with a Bachelor of Science in mathematics.

He worked on MIT's Compatible Time-Sharing System and co-authored its first email program in 1965 with Noel Morris, the brother of film director Errol Morris.

In 1965, he joined Project MAC, the predecessor of the MIT Computer Science and Artificial Intelligence Laboratory. He worked on the development of Multics for more than 16 years at MIT and at Honeywell Information Systems. He has also worked at Tandem Computers, Taligent, CyberCash, Sun Microsystems, Encirq (an Internet advertising company), and SPARTA (a computer security company).

He is an expert in computer security. He is related to mathematician and astronomer John Monroe Van Vleck (1833–1912), mathematician Edward Burr Van Vleck (1863–1943), and Nobel Prize–winning physicist and mathematician John Hasbrouck Van Vleck (1899–1980).

== Bibliography ==
- Operational changes for MR 4.0, T. H. Van Vleck, MULTICS OPERATING STAFF NOTE MOSN-A001, Honeywell, April 23, 1976
- The Multics System Programming Process, Van Vleck, T. H. and Clingen, C. T.; Invited Paper, ICSE 1978, pp. 278–280
- Getting the picture; it can be done, IEEE Computer, vol. 27, no. 5, pp. 112, May 1994
- SPMA - Java Binary Enhancement Tool, DARPA Information Survivability Conference and Exposition - Volume II, pp. 152, April 2003; (DOI)
- Self-Protecting Mobile Agents Obfuscation Report, L. D'Anna, B. Matt, A. Reisse, T. Van Vleck, S. Schwab, and P. LeBlanc, Report #03-015, Network Associates Laboratories, June 2003.
- Anti-Phishing: Best Practices for Institutions and Consumers; Tally, Gregg; Thomas, Roshan; Van Vleck, Tom; McAfee Research, Technical Report # 04-004
- Three Questions about Each Bug You Find, Software Engineering Notes 14:5:62-63 (July 1989)
- Cleaning Up the Basement in the Dark, Software Engineering Notes, (April 1992)
- --, ed., with David Walden, The Compatible Time Sharing System (1961-1973) Fiftieth Anniversary Commemorative Overview, (also at Multicians.org) IEEE Computer Society, 2011
- The IBM 7094 and CTSS
- The IBM 360/67 and CP/CMS
- The IBM 7070
- 1401s I have Known
