= Reverse domain name notation =

Software naming convention

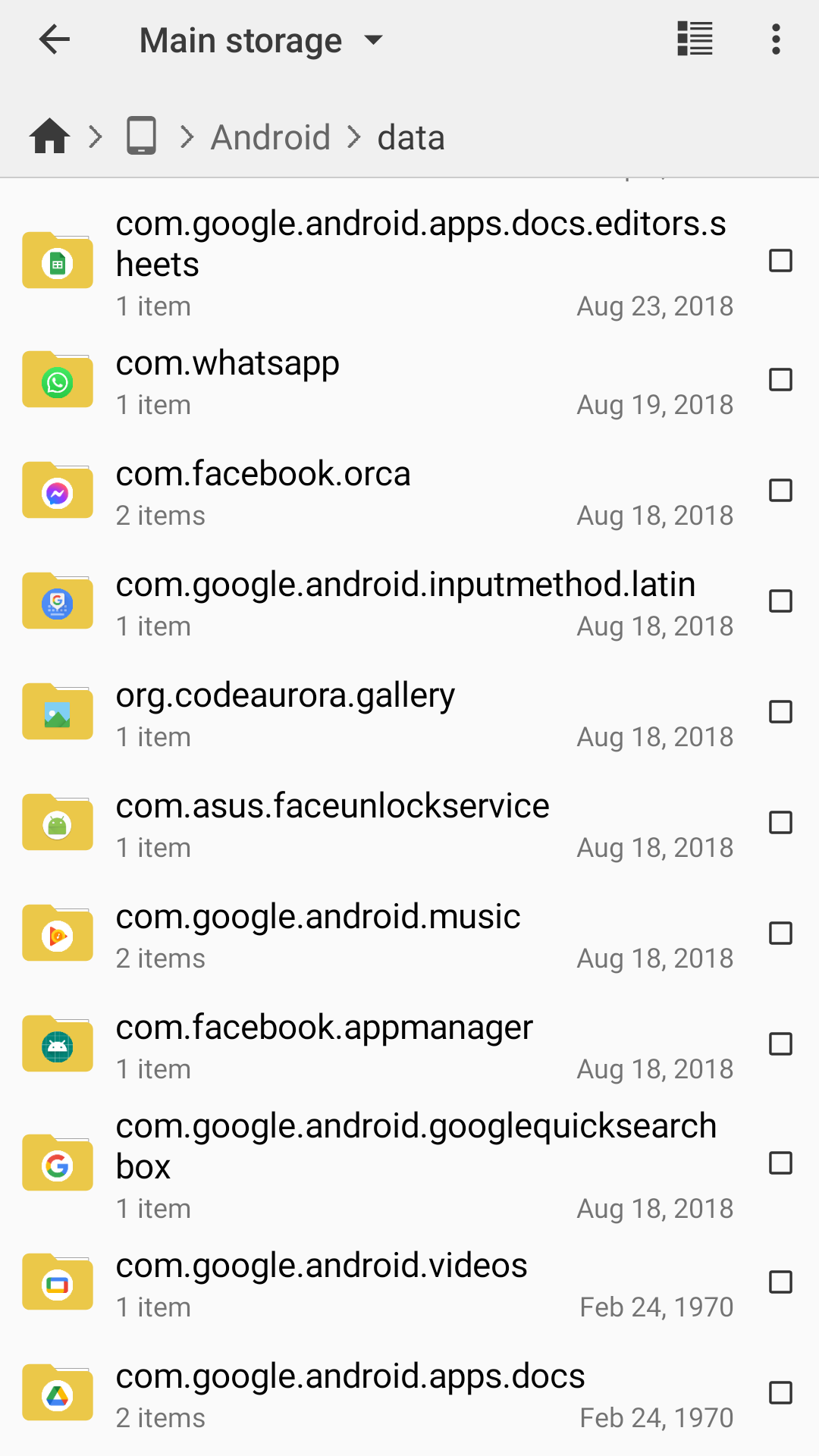
An example of reverse-DNS filesystem hierarchy

Reverse domain name notation (or reverse-DNS) is a naming convention for components, packages, types or file names used by a programming language, system or framework. Reverse-DNS strings are based on registered domain names, with the order of the components reversed for grouping purposes. For example, if a company making the product "MyProduct" has the domain name example.com, they could use the reverse-DNS string com.example.MyProduct as an identifier for that product. Reverse-DNS names are a simple way of eliminating namespace collisions, since any registered domain name is globally unique to its owner (with alt roots making exceptions to this rule possible but unlikely).

== History ==
The first appearance of reversed DNS strings predated the Internet domain name standards. The UK Joint Academic Networking Team (JANET) used this order in its Name Registration Scheme, before the Internet domain name standard was established. For example, the name uk.ac.bris.pys.as was interpreted as a host named as within the UK (top level domain .uk), while the Internet standard would have interpreted it as a host named uk within the American Samoa top level domain (.as). During the period while both JANET-style and Internet-style addresses were in use, mailers and gateway sites had ad-hoc workarounds to handle the differences, but could still be confused.

Reverse-DNS for identifier strings first became widely used with the Java platform.

== Examples ==
Examples of systems that use reverse-DNS notation are:

- Java generally uses it for namespaces, including packages and modules
- Apple's Uniform Type Identifier (UTI)
- The Android operating system, for classifying applications (because the Dalvik virtual machine was based on Java)
- dconf, the configuration backend used by GNOME
- ginitd 'service' identifiers
- The freedesktop.org Desktop Entry Specification and D-Bus Specification
- Flatpak also uses a unique reverse-DNS identifier for each application, aligning with freedesktop.org standard
- iSCSI Qualified Naming
- Lexicons in AT Protocol uses reverse domain name notation followed by an arbitrary name segment for referencing

Some examples of reverse-DNS strings are:

- com.adobe.postscript-font, UTI string for Adobe Systems's PostScript fonts
- com.apple.ostype, UTI string for Apple's OSType
- org.omg.CORBA, Java library for CORBA
- org.w3c.dom, Java library for W3C's DOM
- com.eu.gershwin.DeviceManager, a ginitd service identifier commonly assigned to udev.
- org.kde.dolphin.desktop, a desktop file name

== See also ==
- Non-Internet email address
