= Proofpoint =

American cybersecurity company

Proofpoint, Inc.
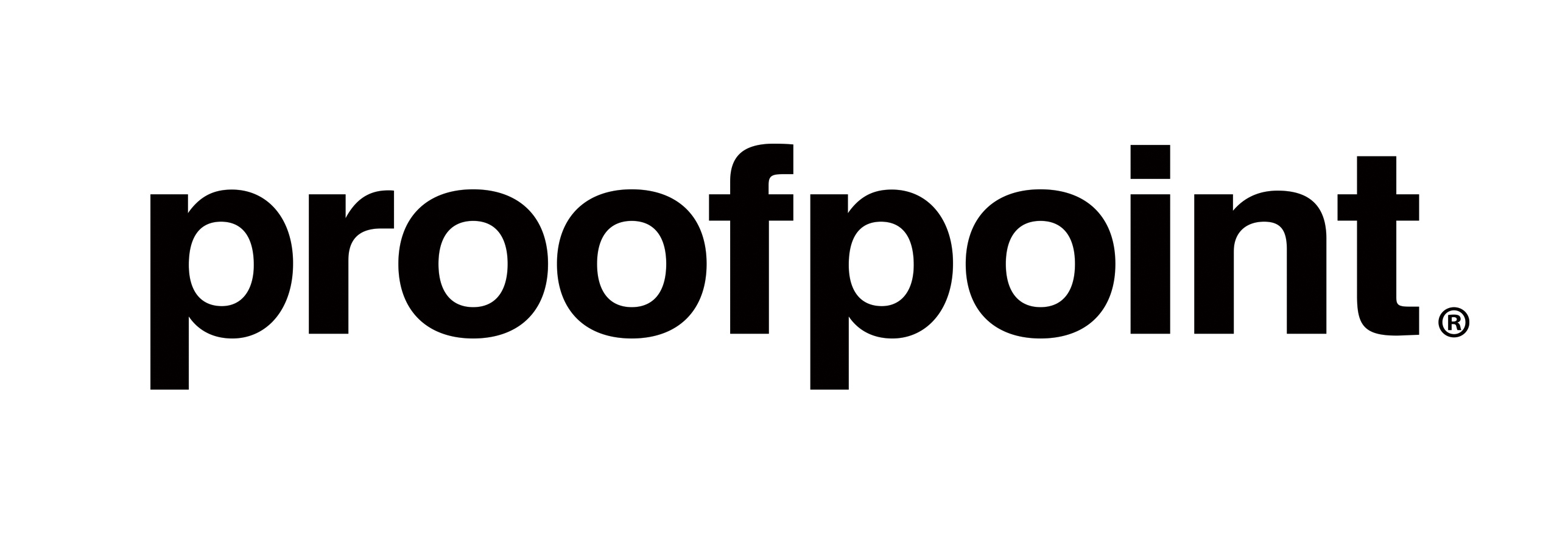

- Proofpoint Headquarters, located in Sunnyvale, California
- Type: Private
- Traded as: Nasdaq: PFPT
- Industry: Security software
- Founded: 2002; 24 years ago
- Founder: Eric Hahn
- Headquarters: Sunnyvale, California, U.S.
- Number of locations: Offices worldwide: Australia, Canada, France, Germany, Israel, Italy, Japan, Singapore, Spain, Sweden, The Netherlands, United Arab Emirates, United Kingdom, United States (California, Colorado, Indiana, Massachusetts, New York, North Carolina, Pennsylvania, Texas, Utah, Virginia)
- Key people: Sumit Dhawan (CEO); Marcel DePaolis (CTO); Rémi Thomas (CFO)
- Products: Identity threat defense Email filtering Email privacy Email encryption Email archiving Anti-spam techniques Electronic discovery Data loss prevention software
- Revenue: ▲US$1.050 billion (2020)
- Operating income: ▲ –US$95.196 million (2020)
- Net income: ▼ –US$163.809 million (2020)
- Total assets: ▲US$2.498 billion (2020)
- Total equity: ▼US$441.744 million (2020)
- Owner: Thoma Bravo
- Number of employees: 3,658 (2020)
- Website: www.proofpoint.com

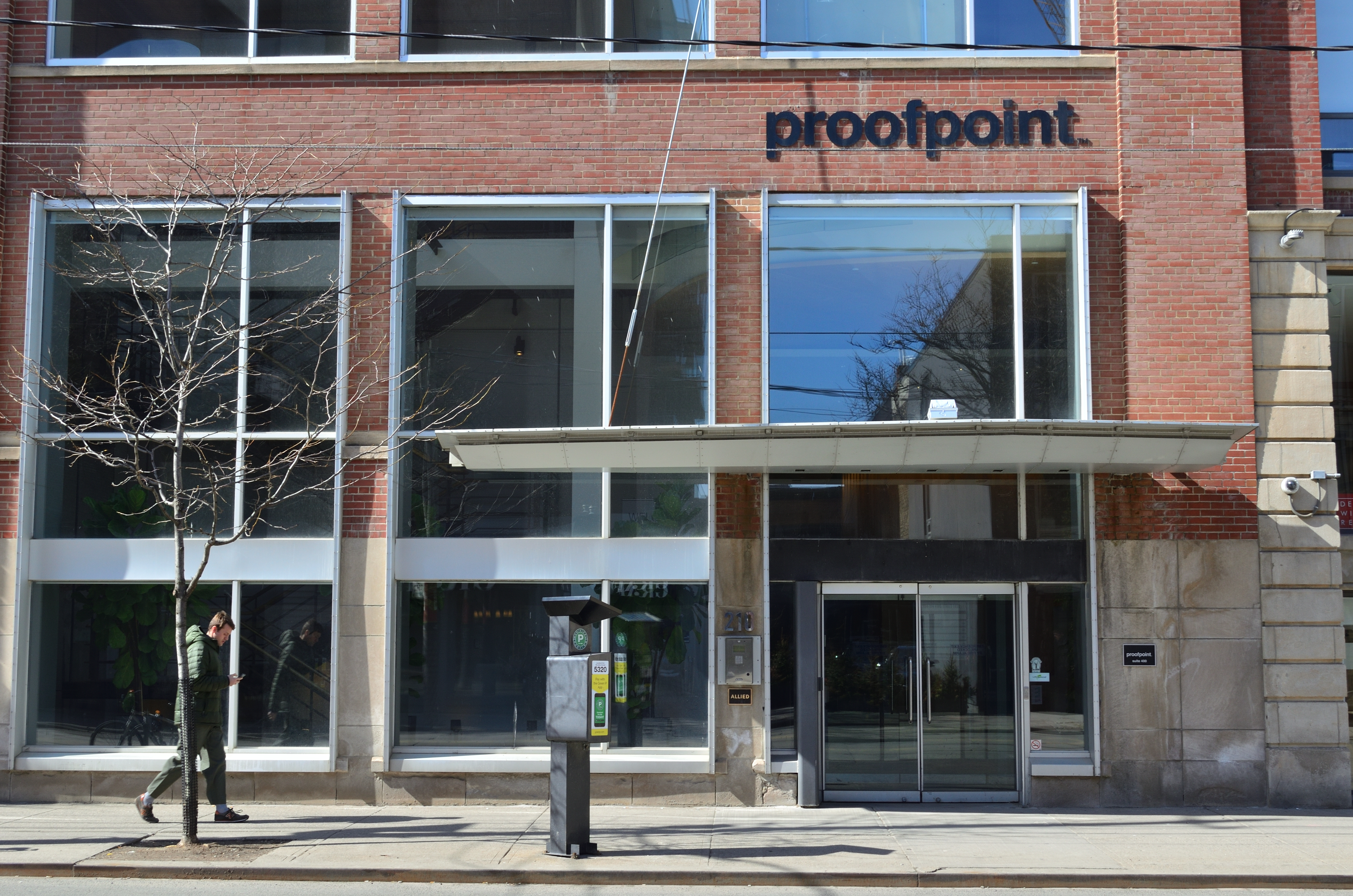
Proofpoint office in Toronto

Proofpoint, Inc. is an American enterprise cybersecurity company based in Sunnyvale, California that provides software as a service and products for email security, identity threat defense, data loss prevention, electronic discovery, and email archiving.

In 2021, Proofpoint was acquired by private equity firm Thoma Bravo for $12.3 billion.

== History ==
The company was founded in July 2002 by Eric Hahn, formerly the CTO of Netscape Communications. It launched July 21, 2003, after raising a $7 million Series A funding round, an additional $9 million in Series B funding led by New York-based RRE Ventures was announced in October, 2003.

The company released the Proofpoint Protection Server (PPS) for medium and large businesses.

Proofpoint became a publicly traded company in April 2012. At the time of its initial public offering (IPO), the company's shares traded at $13 apiece; investors purchased more than 6.3 million shares through the IPO, raising more than $80 million.

On April 26, 2021, Proofpoint announced that it had agreed to be acquired by the private equity firm Thoma Bravo.

In May 2025, Proofpoint announced its acquisition of Hornetsecurity, including its French subsidiary Vade, forming what the company described as the world’s leading email-security group.

In October 2026, Proofpoint announced the acquisition of Varonis Systems, an enterprise cybersecurity company that focuses on Data Security Posture Management (DSPM) and Data Detection and Response (DDR), in a $6.3 billion deal.

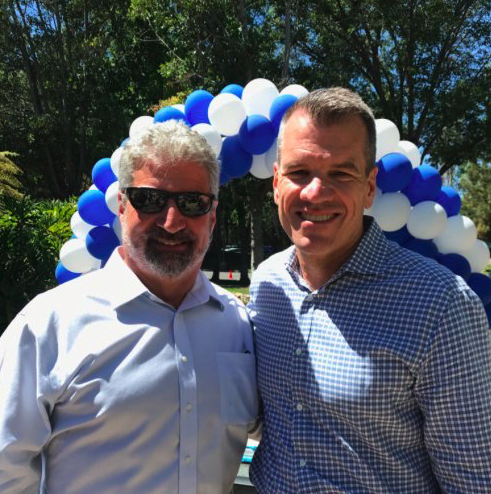
Proofpoint co-founder & chairman Eric Hahn (left) with then-CEO Gary Steele (right) at Proofpoint's 15th-anniversary celebration
