= Delivermail =

Mail transfer agent

The ancestor of sendmail, delivermail, also by Eric Allman, is a mail transport agent that used the FTP protocol on the early ARPANET to transmit e-mail to the recipient. Due to deficiencies in using FTP to send e-mail, a new protocol was created in 1981 for sending e-mail, SMTP. After DNS replaced hosts files, DNS-style host names were also adopted.

In 1980, when delivermail was first shipped with 4.0BSD and 4.1BSD, the ARPANET was still using NCP as its network protocol. When the ARPANET switched to TCP/IP at the end of 1982, the road was paved for MTAs which used TCP to deliver e-mail; delivermail evolved into sendmail.
