= Coloured Book protocols =

UK set of computer communication protocols

The Coloured Book protocols were a set of communication protocols for computer networks developed in the United Kingdom in the 1970s. These protocols were designed to enable communication and data exchange between different computer systems and networks. The name originated with each protocol being identified by the colour of the cover of its specification document. The protocols were in use until the 1990s when the Internet protocol suite came into widespread use.

== History ==
In the mid-1970s, the British Post Office Telecommunications division (BPO-T) worked with the academic community in the United Kingdom and the computer industry to develop a set of standards to enable interoperability among different computer systems based on the X.25 protocol suite for packet-switched wide area network (WAN) communication. First defined in 1975, the standards evolved through experience developing protocols for the NPL network in the late 1960s and the Experimental Packet Switched Service in the early 1970s.

The Coloured Book protocols were used on SERCnet from 1980, and SWUCN from 1982, both of which became part of the JANET academic network from 1984. The protocols were influential in the development of computer networks, particularly in the UK, gained some acceptance internationally as the first complete X.25 standard, and gave the UK "several years lead over other countries".

From late 1991, Internet protocols were adopted on the Janet network instead; they were operated simultaneously for a while, until X.25 support was phased out entirely in August 1997.

== Protocols ==
The standards were defined in several documents, each addressing different aspects of computer network communication. They were identified by the colour of the cover:

=== Pink Book ===
The Pink Book defined protocols for transport over Ethernet. The protocol was basically X.25 level 3 running over LLC2.

=== Orange Book ===
The Orange Book defined protocols for transport over local networks using the Cambridge Ring (computer network).

=== Yellow Book ===
The Yellow Book defined the Yellow Book Transport Service (YBTS) protocol, also known as Network Independent Transport Service (NITS), which was mainly run over X.25. It was developed by the Data Communications Protocols Unit of the Department of Industry in the late 1970s. It could also run over TCP. The Simple Mail Transfer Protocol was extended to allow running over NITS.

The Yellow Book Transport Service was somewhat misnamed, as it does not fulfill the Transport role in the OSI 7-layer model. It really occupies the top of the Network layer, making up for X.25's lack of NSAP addressing at the time, which did not appear until the X.25 (1980) revision, and was not available in implementations for some years afterward. YBTS used source routing addressing between YBTS nodes—there was no global addressing scheme at that time.

=== Green Book ===
The Green Book defined two protocols to connect terminals across a network: an early version of what became Triple-X PAD running over X.25, and the TS29 protocol modelled on Triple-X PAD, but running over YBTS. It was developed by Post Office Telecommunications. These protocols are similar in functionality to TELNET.

=== Fawn Book ===
The Fawn Book defined the Simple Screen Management Protocol (SSMP)

=== Blue Book ===
The Blue Book defined the Network-Independent File Transfer Protocol (NIFTP), analogous to Internet FTP, running over YBTS. Unlike Internet FTP, NIFTP was intended for batch mode rather than interactive usage.

=== Grey Book ===
The Grey Book defined protocols for e-mail transfer (not file transfer as is sometimes claimed), running over Blue Book FTP.

=== Red Book ===
The Red Book defined the Job Transfer and Manipulation Protocol (JTMP), a mechanism for jobs to be transferred from one computer to another, and for the output to be returned to the originating (or another) computer, running over Blue Book FTP.

== Legacy ==
Over time, as technology evolved, many of the concepts and principles from the Coloured Book Protocols were integrated into broader international standards. They remain an important part of the history and evolution of computer networking, marking an early effort to establish standards and protocols for efficient and reliable communication between computers. One famous quirk of Coloured Book was that components of hostnames used reverse domain name notation as compared to the Internet standard. For example, an address might be user@UK.AC.HATFIELD.STAR instead of user@star.hatfield.ac.uk.

== See also ==
- Internet in the United Kingdom § History
- Protocol Wars
