= Mor Harchol-Balter =

American computer scientist (born 1966)

- Born: December 1966 (age 59); Jerusalem, Israel
- Education: Brandeis University (undergrad), U.C. Berkeley (grad)
- Known for: Scheduling (computing), queueing theory, Load balancing (computing), Resource allocation, Performance modeling, Power Management, Heavy tails
- Awards: Dr. Bruce J. Nelson Endowed Chair, Fellow of the ACM, Fellow of IEEE
- Scientific career
- Fields: Computer science, operations research
- Workplaces: Carnegie Mellon University
- Doctoral advisor: Manuel Blum
- Doctoral students: Bianca Schroeder; Adam Wierman
- Website: www.cs.cmu.edu/~harchol/

Mor Harchol-Balter is the Bruce J. Nelson Professor of Computer Science at Carnegie Mellon University. She is known for her work on queueing theory, scheduling and resource allocation, load balancing, data center power management, and heavy-tailed workloads.

== Academic biography ==
Harchol-Balter completed her PhD in 1996 at University of California, Berkeley, under the direction of Manuel Blum. From 1997 to 1999, she was supported by the NSF Postdoctoral Fellowship in the Mathematical Sciences at MIT, under the direction of Tom Leighton. Since 1999, Harchol-Balter has been a professor at CMU in the Computer Science Department.

== Research ==
Harchol-Balter's research focuses on designing new resource allocation policies, including load balancing policies, scheduling policies, and power management policies, for multi-server, distributed systems. She is the author of a popular textbook, Performance Analysis and Design of Computer Systems, published by Cambridge University Press, which bridges Operations Research and Computer Science.

Notable PhD students of Harchol-Balter include: Adam Wierman, Bianca Schroeder, Takayuki Osogami, David McWherter, Varun Gupta, Anshul Gandhi, Sherwin Doroudi, Timothy Zhu, Kristy Gardner, Ziv Scully, Benjamin Berg, and Isaac Grosof.

== Awards and honors ==
Harchol-Balter is the recipient of an endowed chair. She is a Fellow of the ACM and a Fellow of IEEE. She is heavily involved in the SIGMETRICS / PERFORMANCE research community, where she has received many paper awards, including: SIGMETRICS '19, PERFORMANCE '18, INFORMS APS '18, EUROSYS '16, MASCOTS '16, MICRO '10, SIGMETRICS '03, SIGMETRICS '96. She collaborates heavily with industry and is a recipient of dozens of Industrial Faculty Awards including multiple awards from Google, Microsoft, IBM, EMC, Facebook, and Intel. She has won numerous teaching awards, including the Herbert A. Simon Award for Teaching Excellence (2003), the Ruth and Joel Spira Outstanding Teaching Award (2019), and the Teaching Effectiveness Award (1994).
