= Paschalidis =

Paschalidis is a Greek surname. Notable people with the surname include:

- Ioannis Paschalidis (born 1968), American engineer
- Iordanis Paschalidis (born 1967), Greek yacht racer
