= Gamarnik =

Gamarnik, Hamarnik, or Hamarnyk (Ukrainian: Гамарник) is a Jewish and Ukrainian surname that may refer to the following notable people:

- Andrea Gamarnik (born 1964), Argentine molecular virologist
- David Gamarnik, Georgian-born American applied mathematician
- Grigory Gamarnik (1929–2018), Soviet wrestler
- Yan Gamarnik (1894–1937), Soviet politician
