= Aleksander Kwaśniewski =

President of Poland from 1995 to 2005

His Excellency Aleksander Kwaśniewski
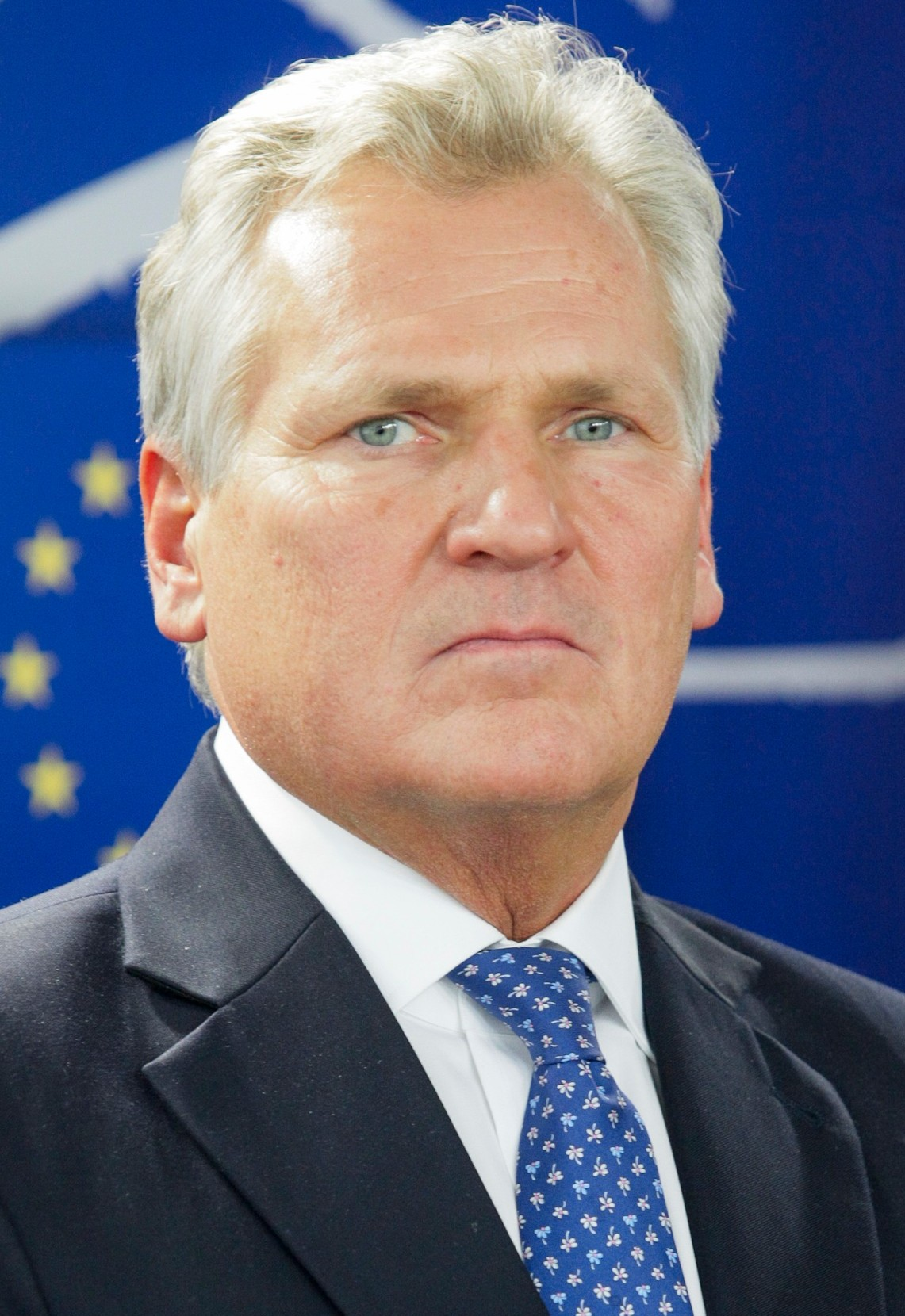
- Kwaśniewski in 2012

President of Poland
- In office 23 December 1995 – 23 December 2005
- Prime Minister: Józef Oleksy; Włodzimierz Cimoszewicz; Jerzy Buzek; Leszek Miller; Marek Belka; Kazimierz Marcinkiewicz
- Preceded by: Lech Wałęsa
- Succeeded by: Lech Kaczyński

Leader of the Social Democracy
- In office 30 January 1990 – 23 December 1995
- Preceded by: Position established
- Succeeded by: Józef Oleksy

Member of Sejm
- In office 4 June 1989 – 23 December 1995

Personal details
- Born: 15 November 1954 (age 72) Białogard, Poland
- Party: Independent (1995–present)
- Other political affiliations: Polish United Workers' Party (1977–1990); Social Democracy (1990–1995); Democratic Left Alliance (1991–1995); Left and Democrats (2007); Europa Plus (2014)
- Spouse: Jolanta Konty (m. 1979)
- Children: 1
- Education: University of Gdańsk (Did not graduate)
- Awards: See list

Aleksander Kwaśniewski (Note: Polish pronunciation: [alɛˈksandɛr kfaˈɕɲɛfskʲi]) (born 15 November 1954) is a Polish politician and journalist who served as the 3rd president of Poland from 1995 to 2005.

Kwaśniewski served as a minister in the communist government during the 1980s, and later led the post-communist centre-left Social Democracy of the Republic of Poland, a successor to the former ruling Polish United Workers' Party, and a co-founder of the Democratic Left Alliance. In 1995, he was elected to the presidency, defeating the incumbent, Lech Wałęsa, and was re-elected in 2000 in a decisive first-round victory. His presidency was marked by modernisation of Poland, rapid economic growth (Poland's GDP doubled in ten years), the drafting of a new constitution (1997), and the accession of Poland to NATO (1999) and the European Union (2004). In 2004, he brokered a pro-democratic agreement during the Orange Revolution in Ukraine.

According to a 2020 poll conducted by Rzeczpospolita, Kwaśniewski was considered the best president in the post-1989 history of Poland by a plurality of Poles.

== Early life and political career ==
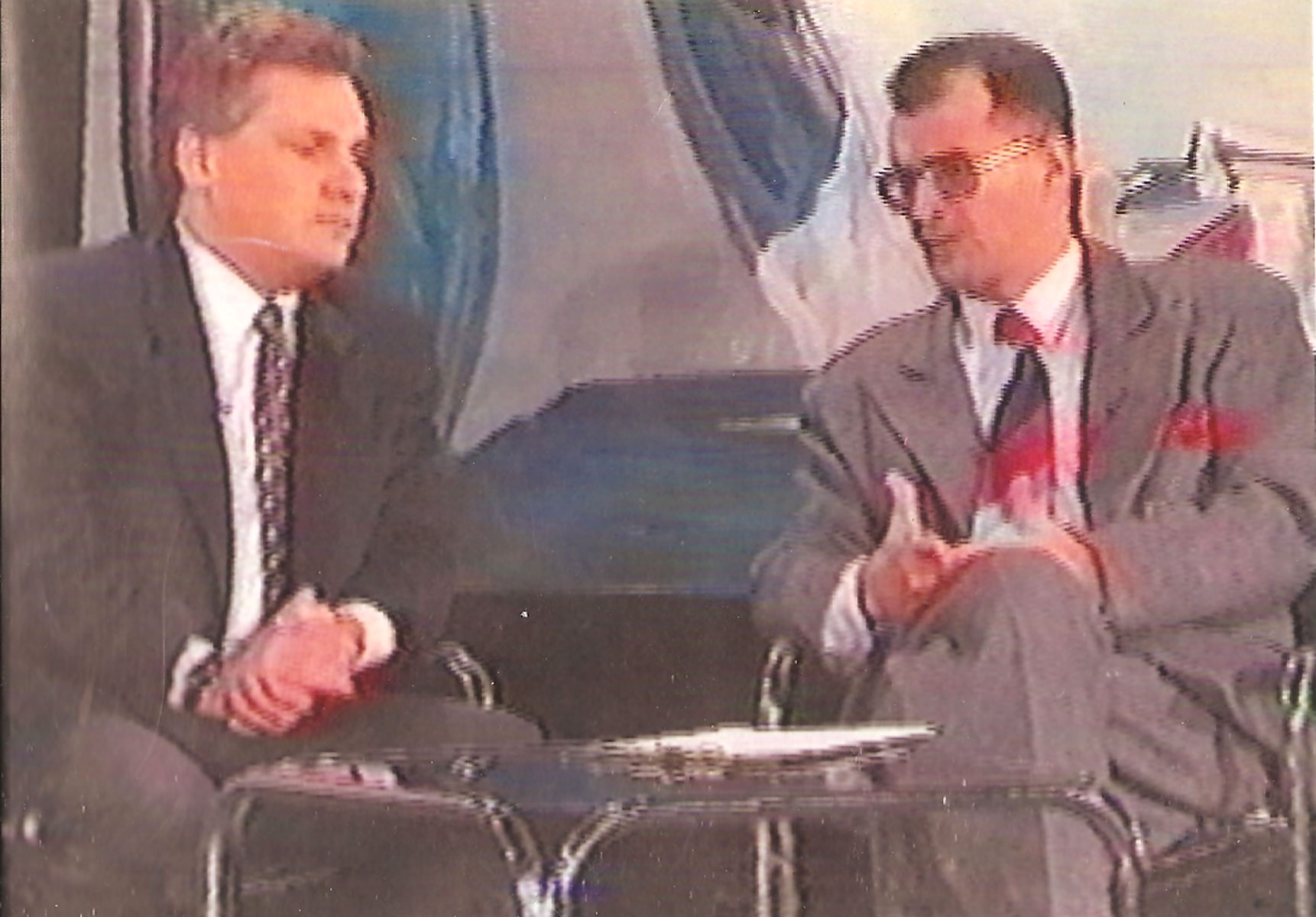
Kwaśniewski (left) on Andrzej Tadeusz Kijowski's talk show in December 1994

Kwaśniewski was born in Białogard. From 1973 to 1977, Kwaśniewski studied Transport Economics and Foreign Trade at the University of Gdańsk, although he never graduated. He became politically active at this time, and joined the ruling Polish United Workers' Party (PZPR) in 1977, remaining a member until it was dissolved in 1990.

An activist in the communist student movement until 1982, he held the position of chairmanship of the University Council of the Socialist Union of Polish Students (SZSP) from 1976 to 1977 and the vice-chairmanship of the Gdańsk Voivodship Union from 1977 to 1979. Kwaśniewski was a member of the SZSP supreme authorities from 1977 to 1982.

From November 1981 to February 1984, he was the editor-in-chief of the communist-controlled student weekly ITD, then editor-in-chief of the daily communist youth Sztandar Młodych from 1984 to 1985. He was a co-founder of the first computer-science periodical in Poland, Bajtek, in 1985. From 1985 to 1987, Kwaśniewski was Minister for Youth Affairs in the Zbigniew Messner government, and then Chairman of the Committee for Youth and Physical Culture till 1990.

He joined the government of Mieczysław Rakowski, first as a Cabinet Minister and then as chairman of the government Social-Political Committee from October 1988 to September 1989. A participant in the Round-Table negotiations, he co-chaired the task group for trade-union pluralism with Tadeusz Mazowiecki and Romuald Sosnowski.

As the PZPR was wound up, he became a founding member of the post-communist Social Democratic Party of the Republic of Poland (SdRP) from January to February 1990, and its first chairman until he assumed the presidency in December 1995. He was also one of the founding members of the coalition Democratic Left Alliance (SLD) in 1991.

Kwaśniewski was an activist in the Student Sports Union from 1975 to 1979 and the Polish Olympic Committee (PKOL); he later served as PKOL president from 1988 to 1991. Running for the Sejm from the Warsaw constituency in 1991, he won the largest number of votes (148,533), although he did not win an absolute majority. Kwaśniewski headed the parliamentary caucus of the Democratic Left Alliance in his first and second terms (1991–1995).

He was a member of the Foreign Affairs Committee and chairman of the Constitutional Committee of the National Assembly from November 1993 to November 1995.

== Presidency (1995–2005) ==
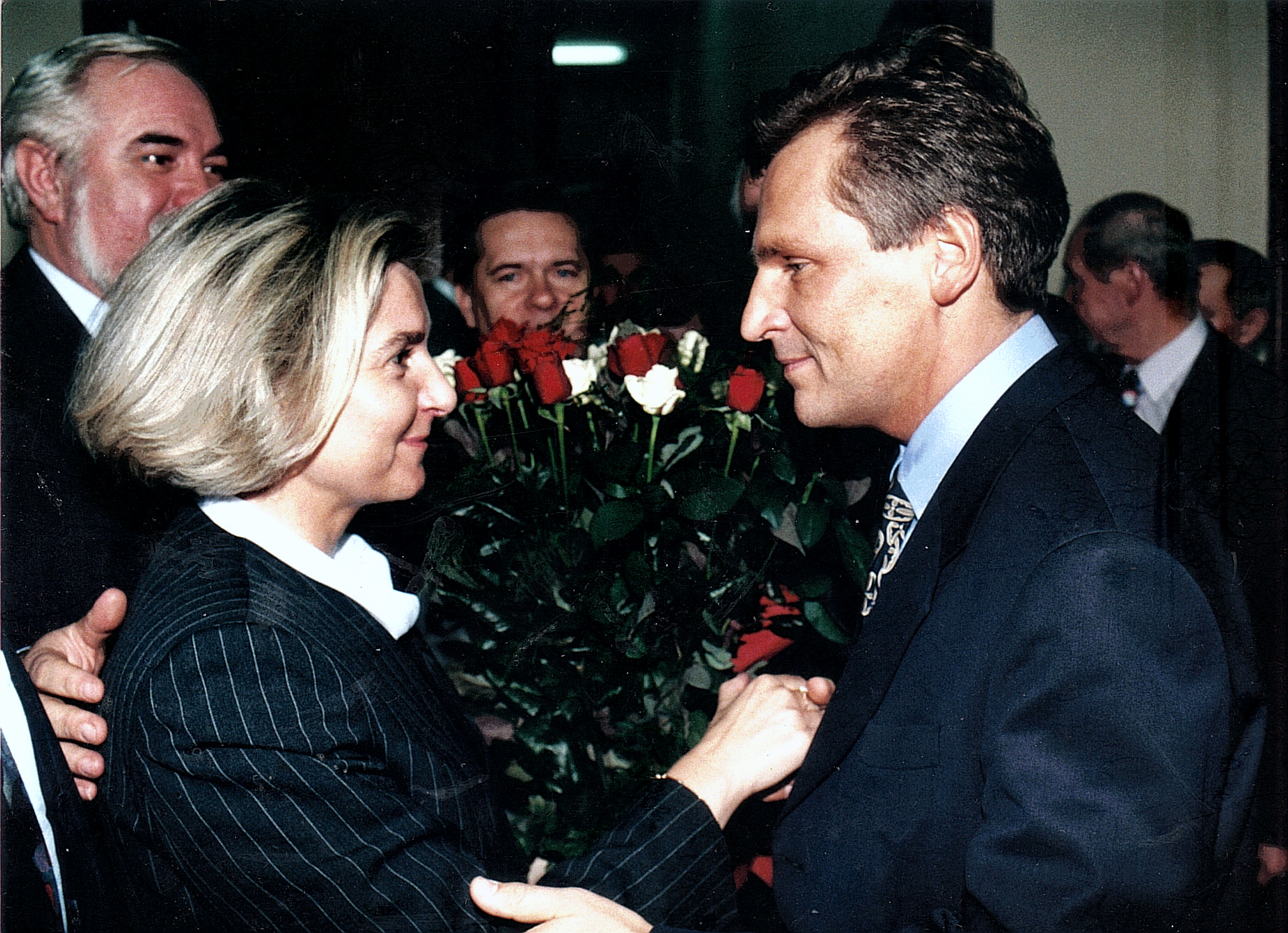
Kwaśniewski receiving praises by supporters after his presidential victory in 1995

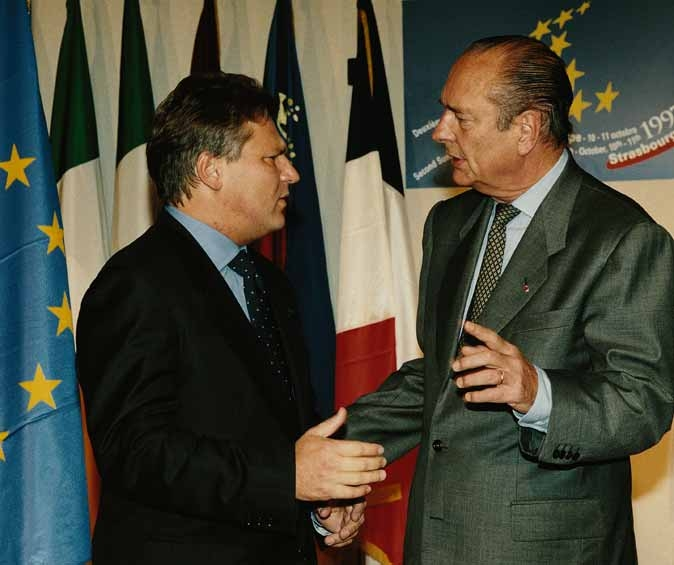
Kwaśniewski with French President Jacques Chirac in Strasbourg, October 1997

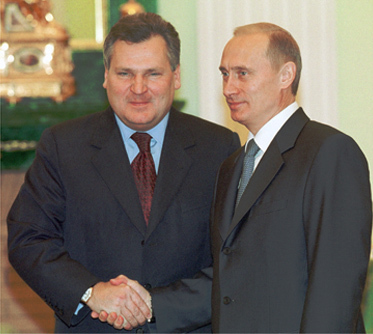
Kwaśniewski with Russian President Vladimir Putin in Moscow, October 2001

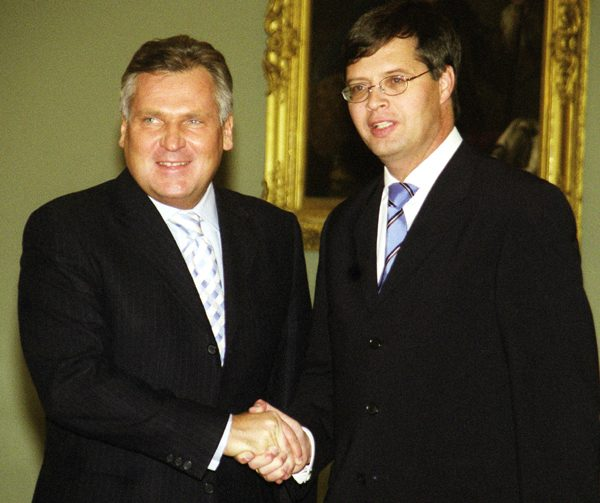
Kwaśniewski with Dutch Prime Minister Jan Peter Balkenende in Warsaw, October 2003

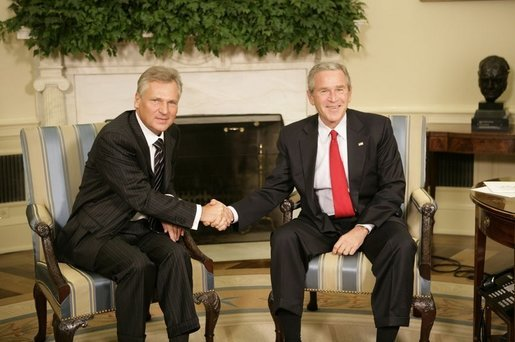
Kwaśniewski with U.S. President George W. Bush in Washington, D.C., October 2005

In an often bitter campaign, Kwaśniewski won the presidential election in 1995, collecting 51.7% of votes in the run-off, against 48.3% for the incumbent, Lech Wałęsa, the former Solidarity leader. Kwaśniewski's campaign slogans were "Let's choose the future" (Wybierzmy przyszłość) and "Poland for all" (Wspólna Polska).

Political opponents disputed his victory and produced evidence to show that he had lied about his education in registration documents and public presentations. There was also some mystery over his graduation from university. A law court confirmed that Kwaśniewski had lied about his record — and this did not come to light until after the election — but did not penalise him for it. Kwaśniewski took the presidential oath of office on 23 December 1995. Later the same day, he was sworn in as Commander-in-Chief of the Armed Forces at the Warszawa First Fighter Wing, in Mińsk Mazowiecki.

His political course resembled that of Wałęsa's in several key respects, such as the pursuit of closer ties to the European Union and NATO. Kwaśniewski also continued the transition to a market economy and the privatisation of state-owned enterprises, although with less energy than his predecessor.

Hoping to be seen as "the president of all Poles", including his political opponents, he resigned from the SLD after the election. Every Polish president since then has renounced formal ties with their party upon taking office. Later, he formed a coalition with the rightist government of Jerzy Buzek, with few major conflicts and on several occasions, he stood against movements of the SLD government of Leszek Miller. At one moment, support for Kwaśniewski reached as high as 80% in popularity polls; most of the time, it was over 50%.

In 1997, the Polish newspaper Życie reported that Kwaśniewski had met former KGB officer Vladimir Alganov at the Baltic sea resort Cetniewo in 1994. First, Kwaśniewski denied ever meeting Alganov and filed a libel suit against the newspaper. Eventually, Kwaśniewski admitted that he had met Alganov on official occasions, but denied meeting him in Cetniewo.

Kwaśniewski's greatest achievement was his ability to enact a new Constitution of Poland to replace the modified Communist-era document then still in use. Although the old constitution had been pruned of its Communist and Stalinist character, the failure to create a new constitution had been a criticism often levelled at Wałęsa. Kwaśniewski actively campaigned for its approval in the subsequent referendum, and he signed it into law on 16 July 1997. He took an active part in the efforts to secure Polish membership of NATO.

He headed Poland's delegation at the 1997 Madrid summit, where Poland, the Czech Republic, and Hungary were promised membership; and the Washington summit, where on 26 February 1999, during the Kosovo conflict, which he supported, he signed the instruments ratifying Poland's membership of NATO. He also took an active part in promoting further enlargement of the alliance, speaking out in favor of membership for a further seven states and the open-door policy that leaves open the option of further members.

He was an author of the 2002 Riga Initiative, a forum for cooperation between Central European states, aimed towards further enlargement of NATO and the European Union.

An advocate of regional cooperation in Central and Eastern Europe, Kwaśniewski hosted a summit of the region's leaders at Łańcut in 1996. Speaking out against the danger organised crime posed to the region, he submitted a draft of a convention on fighting organised crime to the UN in 1996. He was an active participant at meetings of regional leaders in Portorož in 1997, Levoča in 1998, and Lviv and Yalta in 1999.

After a history of sometimes acrimonious relations with Lithuania, Kwaśniewski was a driving force behind the presidential summit in Vilnius in 1997, at which the two countries' presidents signed a treaty of friendship. Poland subsequently became one of the strongest advocates of Lithuanian membership in NATO and the European Union and the strongest advocate of Ukraine in Europe. In 2000, he was re-elected in a single round, collecting 53.9% of the vote. His election campaign slogan was: "A home for all—Poland" (Dom wszystkich—Polska). To date, this is the only time since the end of Communism that a presidential election has been decided in a single round.

Following the 11 September 2001 attacks, Kwaśniewski organised an international conference in Warsaw, with the participation of leaders from Central, Eastern and South-Eastern Europe to strengthen regional activities in fighting international terrorism. Under Kwaśniewski's leadership, Poland became a strong ally of the United States in the war on terror and contributed troops in the Iraq War, a move that was highly controversial in Poland and Europe.

Poland was in charge of a sector of Iraq after the removal of Saddam Hussein. Polish membership of the European Union became a reality on 1 May 2004, during Kwaśniewski's second term. Both he and his wife Jolanta had campaigned for approval of the EU accession treaty in June 2003. He strongly supported including mention of Europe's Christian roots into the European Constitution. Thanks to his close relations with Leonid Kuchma, in late 2004 he became a mediator in a political conflict in Ukraine – the Orange Revolution, and according to some commentators, he played the major role in its peaceful solution.

After the release of the Senate Intelligence Committee report on CIA torture in December 2014, Kwaśniewski admitted that he had agreed in 2003 to host a secret CIA black site in Poland, but that activities were to be carried out in accordance with Polish law. He said that a U.S. draft memorandum had stated that "people held in Poland are to be treated as prisoners of war and will be afforded all the rights they are entitled to", but due to time constraints, the U.S. had not signed the memorandum. The U.S. had conducted activities in great secrecy at the site.

=== Controversial pardons ===
In December 2005, when his presidency was coming to an end, he granted clemency for a post-Communist deputy minister of Justice Zbigniew Sobotka, who had been sentenced to 3.5 years of prison for revealing a state secret (effectively, he warned gangsters about an operation against them). Kwaśniewski changed the prison sentence to probation.

Another case of Kwaśniewski's controversial granting of pardons was the Peter Vogel case. The story goes back to 1971 when Piotr Filipczyński, a.k.a. Peter Vogel, was sentenced to 25 years in jail for a brutal murder (shortened to 15 years in 1979). Surprisingly enough, in 1983 (during martial law in Poland), he was granted a passport and allowed to leave the country. He returned in 1990, soon earning the nickname "the accountant of the Left" as a former Swiss banker who took care of more than thirty accounts of Polish social democrats. Despite an arrest warrant issued in 1987, Vogel moved freely in Poland and was eventually arrested in 1998 in Switzerland. After Vogel's extradition to Poland, in 1999, Kwaśniewski initiated the procedure of granting him amnesty. In December 2005 (a few days before leaving his office), Kwaśniewski pardoned Vogel despite the negative opinion of the procurer.

=== Rywingate ===
Kwaśniewski refused in 2003 to face a special parliamentary commission, which was set up to reveal all circumstances linked with Rywingate. Kwaśniewski argued that the constitution did not allow parliamentary commissions to investigate the president, and there were no clear legal opinions. The commission decided eventually not to summon Kwaśniewski.

For a second time, Kwaśniewski refused as a witness to face the commission investigating the privatisation of Orlen petrol concern, in March 2005. He argued that the actions of commission members, being in opposition to the leftist government supported by him, were directed against him. He sought to undermine the commission by releasing considerable amounts of information to journalists while only belatedly making it available to the commission members.

=== Member of secret police allegations ===
In 2007, the Institute of National Remembrance revealed that Kwaśniewski was registered during communist times as an agent "Alek" of the secret police, the Security Service (Służba Bezpieczeństwa – SB), from 1983 to 1989. Kwaśniewski himself denied having been an agent in a special statement, demanded from politicians by Polish law, and a court confirmed his statement.

== Post-presidency ==
On 7 March 2006, Kwaśniewski was appointed Distinguished Scholar in the Practice of Global Leadership at Georgetown University, where he teaches students in the Edmund A. Walsh School of Foreign Service about contemporary European politics, the trans-Atlantic relationship, and democratisation in Central and Eastern Europe. He also teaches a course on political leadership, convened by Professor Carol Lancaster, with former Spanish Prime Minister José María Aznar. He is also Chairman of the supervisory board of the International Centre for Policy Studies in Kyiv, Ukraine and a member of the International Honorary Council of the European Academy of Diplomacy. In 2008, Aleksander Kwaśniewski became Chairman of the European Council on Tolerance and Reconciliation, a not-for-profit organisation established to monitor tolerance in Europe, prepare practical recommendations to governments and international organisations on improving interreligious and interethnic relations on the continent. The organisation is co-chaired by European Jewish Fund President Viatcheslav Moshe Kantor. Since June 2012 Kwaśniewski and Pat Cox lead a European Parliament monitoring mission in Ukraine to monitor the criminal cases against Yulia Tymoshenko, Yuriy Lutsenko and Valeriy Ivaschenko. Since 2011, Kwaśniewski has served on the Leadership Council for Concordia, a nonpartisan, nonprofit based in New York City focused on promoting effective public-private collaboration to create a more prosperous and sustainable future. Kwaśniewski was also involved with the EU talks with the Ukrainian government about the association agreement with the EU that the Ukrainian parliament failed to ratify in November 2013. After the Maidan unrest had installed the transitional government under Yatsenyuk, who signed the EU association agreement for Ukraine in 2014, Kwaśniewski took up in a director's post in the gas company "Burisma Holdings Limited" which owns licenses for the major Ukrainian gas fields.

In 2019, he became a Member of the International Advisory Council (IAC) to Uzbekistan. In 2020, he assumed the position of Chair of the Eastern Europe and Central Asia Commission on Drugs.

=== Possible illegal lobbying on behalf of Paul Manafort ===
In a plea agreement filed in United States Federal court on 14 September 2018, former Donald Trump campaign chair Paul Manafort admitted to organising a group of former European heads of state to illegally lobby, starting in 2011, on behalf of then-Ukrainian president Viktor Yanukovych. The plea agreement describes one of the heads of state involved in this secret lobbying as a "former Polish President" who "was also a representative of the European Parliament with oversight responsibility for Ukraine." At least one press report claimed that Kwaśniewski was this former Polish President.

== Awards ==
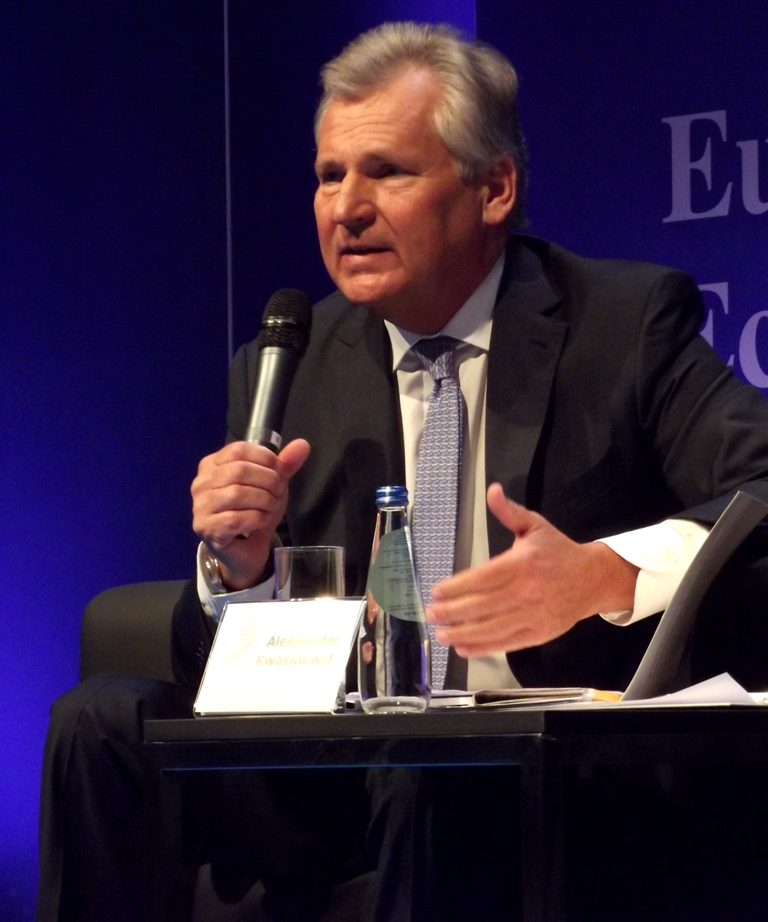
Aleksander Kwaśniewski during the 2013 European Economic Forum

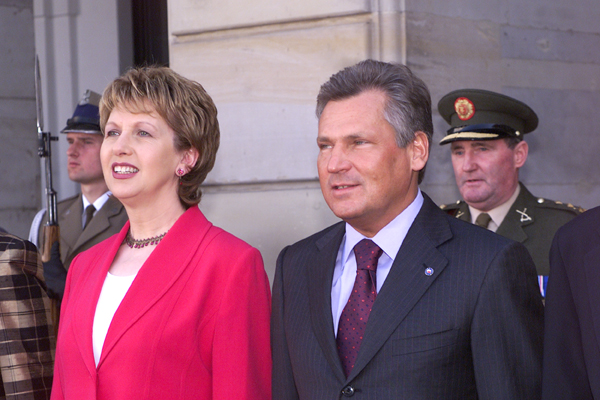
Kwaśniewski with the President of Ireland Mary McAleese in Dublin, Ireland.

Aleksander Kwaśniewski has been honoured to date with the following decorations:

- Poland: Grand Master of the Order of the White Eagle (ex officio); Knight of the Order of Polonia Restituta First Class, Grand Master of the Order and President of the Chapter
- Lithuania: Grand Cross of the Order of Vytautas the Great (1996), Grand Cross of the Order of the Lithuanian Grand Duke Gediminas (1999); Order of Vytautas the Great with Golden Chain (2005)
- United Kingdom: Honorary Knight Grand Cross of the Most Honourable Order of the Bath (March 1996); Honorary Knight Grand Cross of the Most Distinguished Order of St Michael and St George (October 1996)
- Italy: Knight Grand Cross of the Order of Merit of the Italian Republic with Collar (1996)
- France: Grand Cross of the Legion of Honour (1996)
- Norway: Grand Cross of the Royal Order of Saint Olav (1996)
- Greece: Grand Cross of the Order of the Redeemer (1996)
- Finland: Grand Cross of the Order of the White Rose with Collar (1997)
- Latvia: Grand Cross of the Order of the Three Stars (1997)
- Netherlands: Knight Grand Cross of the Order of the Netherlands Lion (1997)
- Finland: Commander Grand Cross, with Collar, of the Order of the White Rose of Finland (1997)
- Malaysia: Honorary Recipient of the Order of the Crown of the Realm (1997)
- Ukraine: Order of Prince Yaroslav the Wise, 1st class (1997); Order of Merit, 1st class (2005)
- Portugal: Order of Infant Henry with Grand Ribbon (1997)
- Slovakia: Grand Cross (or 1st Class) of the Order of the White Double Cross (1997)
- Estonia: Grand Cross with Ribbon of the Order of the Cross of Terra Mariana (1998); Collar of the Order of the White Star (2002)
- Romania: Grand Cross of the Order of the Star of Romania with Sash (1999)
- Chile: Grand Chain of the Order of Merit (1999)
- Belgium: Grand Cordon of the Order of Leopold (1999)
- Turkey: First Class of the Order of the State of the Republic of Turkey (2000)
- Croatia: Grand Order of King Tomislav with Sash and Great Star (April 2001)
- Spain: Grand Cross of the Order of Isabella the Catholic with Chain (2001)
- Hungary: Grand Cross of the Order of Merit of the Republic of Hungary with Collar (2001)
- Brazil: Collar of the National Order of the Southern Cross (2002)
- Peru: Special Grand Cross of the Order of Merit "in recognition of the Special Merit" (2002)
- Germany: Grand Cross of the Order of Merit of the Federal Republic of Germany (2002)
- Japan: Grand Cordon of the Supreme Order of the Chrysanthemum (2002)
- Czech Republic: Collar of the Order of the White Lion (2004)
- Japan: Collar of the Supreme Order of the Chrysanthemum (2004)
- International: Order of the Smile (1993)
- International: Golden Olympic Order of the International Olympic Committee in (1998)
- International: Gold Order of Merit of the International Amateur Athletic Federation (1999)
- International: Medal of Merit of the European Olympic Committee (2000)
- Awarded doctor honoris causa by the Hebrew University in Jerusalem (2004), Kyiv-Mohyla Academy (2005) and the University of Vilnius (2005). In 2010, became an honorary citizen of Warsaw.
- Kwaśniewski was awarded the highest distinction of the Polish Orthodox Church, the Order of Saint Magdalena, first degree with decorations (1998). He received the television "Wiktor" prize three times (1993, 1995 and 2000).
- Jan Karski Eagle Award (2010).
- Commonwealth Award of Distinguished Service (2007)
- Knight of Freedom Award (2009)
- Steiger Award (2009)

== Personal life ==
In 1979, Kwaśniewski married lawyer Jolanta Konty in a civil ceremony. They have one daughter, Aleksandra (born 1981).

He identifies as an atheist. In 2005, at the end of his second presidential term, the couple finalised their marriage in a low-key Catholic ceremony presided by Kwaśniewski's former presidential chaplain, in the presidential chapel. He is fluent in both English and Russian.

== See also ==
- Presidents of Poland
- 2005 Polish presidential election

== Notes ==
Party political offices
| Position established | Leader of the Social Democracy; 1990 – 1995 | Succeeded by Józef Oleksy |
Political offices
| Preceded by Lech Wałęsa | President of Poland; 1995 – 2005 | Succeeded by Lech Kaczyński |
