= Paul Tseng =

Chinese-American mathematician (born 1959)

- 曾匀
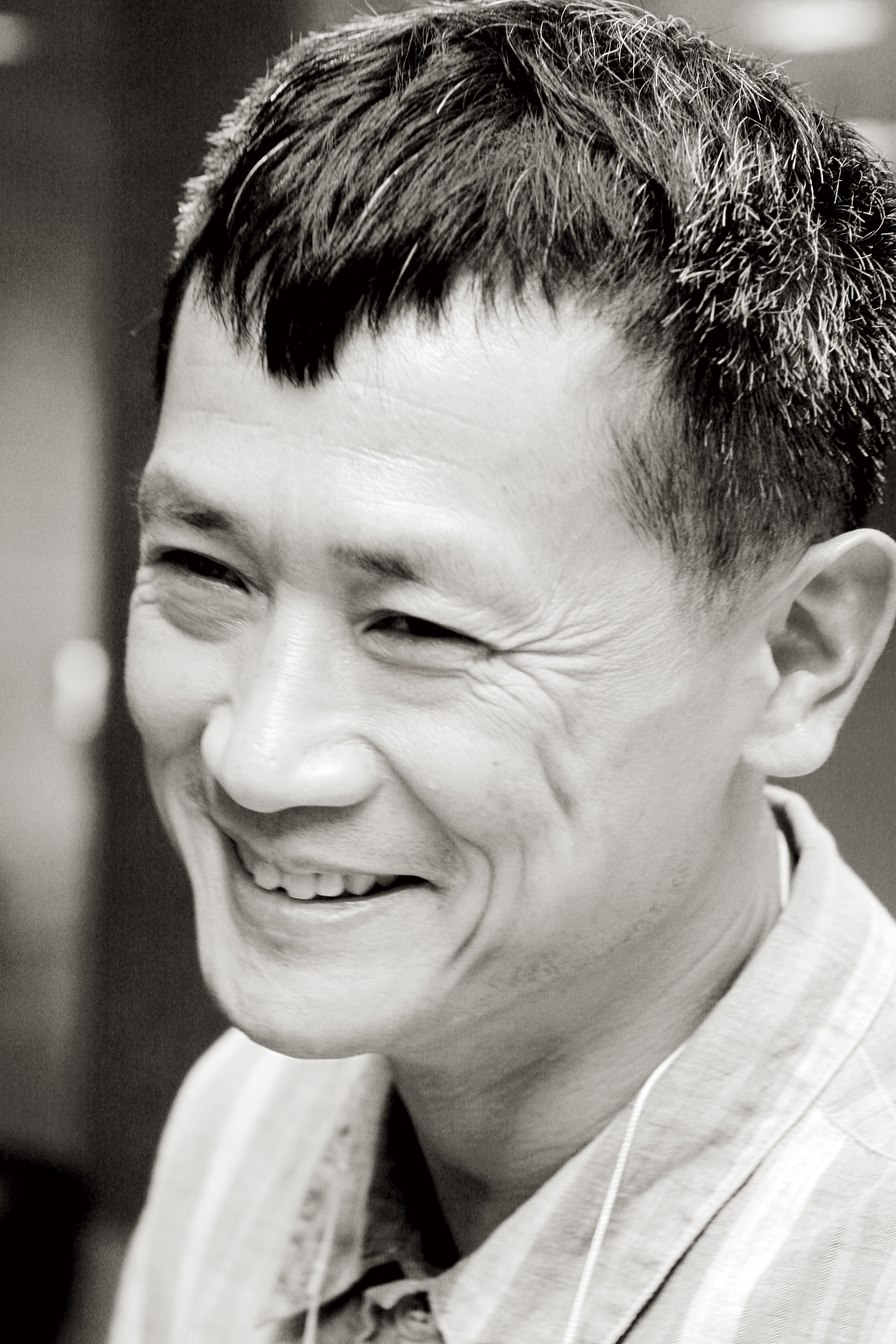
- Born: September 21, 1959; Hsinchu, Taiwan
- Disappeared: August 13, 2009, (age 49); Yunan province of China
- Status: Missing for 17 years, 3 months and 5 days
- Citizenship: United States and Canada
- Scientific career
- Education: Queen's University (BSc); Massachusetts Institute of Technology (PhD)
- Known for: Large-scale optimization Convex optimization Linear programming Distributed computing Network algorithms
- Fields: Optimization, Mathematics, Network
- Workplaces: University of British Columbia; Massachusetts Institute of Technology; University of Washington
- Doctoral advisor: Dimitri Bertsekas

Paul Tseng (Chinese: 曾匀) was a Taiwanese-born American-Canadian applied mathematician and a professor at the Department of Mathematics at the University of Washington, in Seattle, Washington. Tseng was recognized by his peers to be one of the leading optimization researchers of his generation. On August 13, 2009, Paul Tseng went missing while kayaking in the Jinsha River in the Yunnan province of China and is presumed dead.

== Biography ==
Tseng was born September 21, 1959, in Hsinchu, Taiwan. In December 1970, Tseng's family moved to Vancouver, British Columbia. Tseng received his B.Sc. from Queen's University in 1981 and his Ph.D. from Massachusetts Institute of Technology in 1986 under the supervision of Dimitri Bertsekas. In 1990 Tseng moved to the University of Washington's Department of Mathematics. Tseng has conducted research primarily in continuous optimization and secondarily in discrete optimization and distributed computation.

== Research ==
Tseng made many contributions to mathematical optimization, publishing many articles and helping to develop quality software that has been widely used. He published over 120 papers in optimization and had close collaborations with several colleagues, including Dimitri Bertsekas and Zhi-Quan Tom Luo.

Tseng's research subjects include:

- Efficient algorithms for structured convex programs and network flow problems,
- Complexity analysis of interior point methods for linear programming,
- Parallel and distributed computing,
- Error bounds and convergence analysis of iterative algorithms for optimization problems and variational inequalities,
- Interior point methods and semidefinite relaxations for hard quadratic and matrix optimization problems, and
- Applications of large scale optimization techniques in signal processing and machine learning.

In his research, Tseng gave a new proof for the sharpest complexity result for path-following interior-point methods for linear programming. Furthermore, together with Tom Luo, he resolved a long-standing open question on the convergence of matrix splitting algorithms for linear complementarity problems and affine variational inequalities. Tseng was the first to establish the convergence of the affine scaling algorithm for linear programming in the presence of degeneracy. Tseng has coauthored (with his Ph.D. advisor, Dimitri Bertsekas) a publicly available network optimization program, called RELAX, which has been widely used in industry and academia for research purposes. This software has been used by statisticians like Paul R. Rosenbaum and Donald Rubin in their work on propensity score matching. Tseng's software for matching has similarly been used in nonparametric statistics to implement exact tests. Tseng has also developed a program called ERELAXG, for network optimization problems with gains. In 2010 conferences in his honor were held at the University of Washington and at Fudan University in Shanghai. Tseng's personal web page can be accessed in the exact state it was at the time of his disappearance, and contains many of his writings.

== Travels and disappearance ==
Tseng was an ardent bicyclist, kayaker and backpacker. He took many adventurous trips, including kayak tours along the Mekong, the Danube, the Nile and the Amazon. On August 13, 2009, Tseng went missing while kayaking in the Yantze river near Lijiang, Yunnan province of China and is now presumed dead.

== See also ==
- Computer networking
- Dynamic programming
- List of convexity topics
- List of people who disappeared mysteriously (2000–present)
- Neural network
- Reinforcement learning
