= International Teletraffic Congress =

The International Teletraffic Congress (ITC) is the first international conference in networking science and practice. It was created in 1955 by Arne Jensen to initially cater to the emerging need to understand and model traffic in telephone networks using stochastic methodologies, and to bring together researchers with these considerations as a common theme. Up through World War II, teletraffic research was done mainly by engineers and mathematicians working in telephone companies. Most of their work was published in local or company journals. In 1955, however, the field acquired a formal, international, institutional structure, with the organization of the first International Teletraffic Congress (ITC).

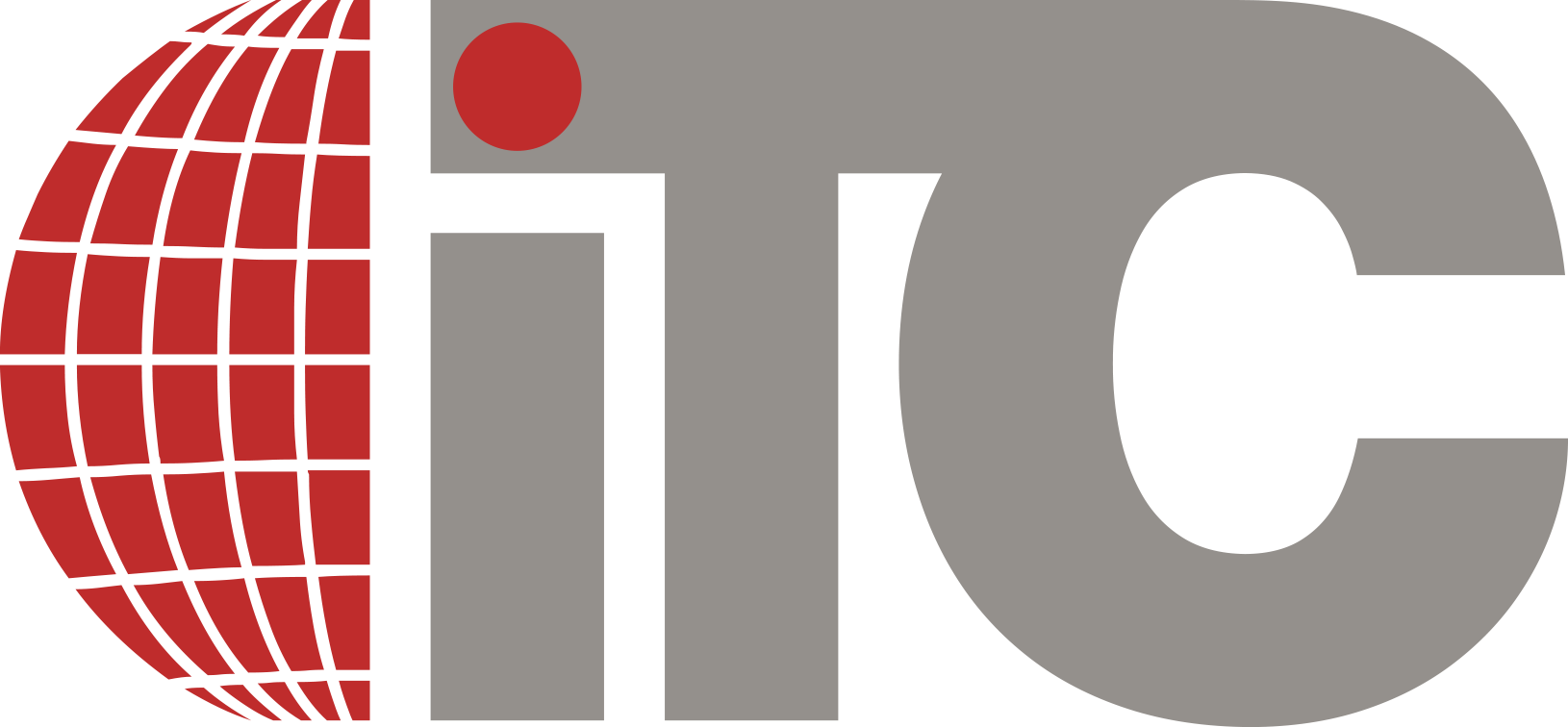
International Teletraffic Conference (ITC) logo used since 2016

Over the years, it has broaden its scope to address a wide spectrum ranging from the mathematical theory of traffic processes, stochastic system modelling and analysis, traffic and performance measurements, network management, traffic engineering to network capacity planning and cost optimization, including network economics and reliability for various types of networks. ITC served as a forum for all theoretical fundamentals and engineering practices for large-scale deployment and operation of telecommunications networks. Since its inception, ITC witnessed the evolution of communications and networking: the influence of computer science on telecommunication, the advent of the Internet and the massive deployment of mobile communications and optics, the appearance of peer-to-peer networking and social networks, the ever increasing speed and flexibility of new communication technologies, networks, user devices, and applications, and the ever changing operation challenges arising from this development. ITC documented this evolution with contemporary measurement studies, performance analyses of new technologies, recommendations for provisioning and configuration, and greatly contributed to the methodological toolbox of network scientists.

Today, with its conferences, specialist seminars, regional seminars, training courses and publications, the ITC aims at a worldwide forum for all questions related to network and service performance, management, and assessment, both present and futuristic. The notion of traffic is broadly used to encompass data traffic from the MAC layer all the way to application traffic in the application layer. The scope of ITC is thus ranging all issues embedding operations, design, planning, economics and performance analysis of current and emerging communication networks and services, to be addressed by applying a variety of tools from different fields, such as Stochastic Processes, Information theory, Control theory, Signal and Processing, Game theory and optimization techniques, Statistical methodologies and Artificial Intelligence techniques. The target audience of such issues is experts from research organizations, universities, equipment vendors and suppliers, network operators, service providers, system integrators and international technical organizations, guaranteeing a well-balanced contribution from theory, application, and practice. The general goal remains to bring researchers and practitioners together toward operational understanding of all types of current and future networks.

The ITC is ruled by the International Advisory Council (IAC) which gathers a number of technical experts, from universities and the research arms of key corporations in the industry, from countries having a strong tradition in teletraffic development. The IAC responsibilities are to disseminate information on teletraffic which is of interest for the whole community and:

- to select the locations of Plenary Congresses and to ensure their high-level technical programme
- to support Specialist Seminars on specific topics of current interest
- to promote Regional Seminars for the dissemination of teletraffic concepts in developing countries
- to facilitate the liaison activity with the ITU through participation in the standardization process and in the Development Programme

The technical program and the organization of each ITC event remains within the responsibilities of the hosting country, but with significant IAC support to guarantee that the event is consistent with the quality standards established during the previous congresses.

The ITC Plenary Congresses were scheduled tri-annually from 1955 until 1995 when the interval became bi-annual to account for the ever-accelerating development of network technologies, products and services and the associated dramatic increases in network demands. Similarly, to better cover the impact of dramatic changes undergoing in the field of computer and communication systems, networks and usage, it has been decided to hold the Plenary Congress on an annual basis from 2009.

== Content ==
Teletraffic science is the traditional term for all theoretical fundamentals and engineering practices to describe data flows in telecommunication networks, the performance of the usage of network resources, procedures for sizing of resources and engineering the networks for given traffic load and quality of service requirements. For more than 50 years of the 20th century, traffic or teletraffic has been identified primarily with telephone networks. With the huge development of computers, stored program control of network nodes and computer communication, the traditional teletraffic science field naturally extended to computer networks, mobile and wireless/optical networks, and for a wide spectrum of new applications. The convergence between the voice network, the Internet, the television and mobility raised new questions that request new models and tools to be developed. In addition, the development of community networks, home networking, multiple access networking technologies, and the advent of pervasive and ambient communications dictates new challenges to be addressed. Today, ITC addresses the emerging paradigms such as an increasing diversity of distributed applications and services over various media like mobile/optical networks, enabling new markets and economy.

ITC has steered the evolutions in communications since its creation in 1955 and remains at the forefront of innovation regarding modeling and performance. The scientific roots of communications traffic are based on the theory of probability and stochastic processes, modelling and performance evaluation. Modelling is the key for the mathematical description and quantitative performance analysis. Traffic flows are described by stochastic processes with complex dependencies which have to be validated by traffic measurements. Modelling also includes operational properties of resource control reflected by service strategies such as queueing disciplines, admission control, and routing. The results of such performance analyses are used for resource dimensioning (sizing), resource management, and network optimization while providing targeted Quality of Service. Teletraffic science is closely related to methods of operation research (queueing theory, optimization, forecasting) and computational sciences (simulation technology distributed systems).

In this context, ITC represents a wide community of researchers and practitioners and is regularly organizing events like Congresses, Specialist Seminars and Workshops in order to discuss the latest changes in the modelling, design and performance of communication systems, networks and services.

=== The evolution of technologies of the 20th century ===
ITC has been witnessing the change of communication and networking technologies which are reflected in the proceedings and programs of the congresses. The specialist seminars and the motto of the congresses thereby reflect the hot topics of that time and the evolution. Selected topics of the 70's, 80's and 90's were

- 1998: Traffic Issues related to Multimedia and Nomadic Communications
- 1995: Traffic Modeling and Measurement in Broadband and Mobile Communications
- 1990: Broadband Technologies: Architectures, Applications, Control and Performance
- 1986: ISDN Traffic Issues
- 1984: Fundamentals of Teletraffic Theory
- 1977: Modeling of SPC Exchanges and Data Networks

=== Recent topics in the 21st century ===
With the rise of the Internet, new networking paradigms and technologies but also new challenges emerged:

- 2020: Teletraffic in the era of beyond-5G and AI
- 2019: Networked Systems and Services
- 2018: Teletraffic in the Smart World
- 2017: Ubiquitous, software-based, and sustainable networks and services
- 2016: Digital Connected World
- 2015: Traffic, Performance and Big Data
- 2014: Towards a Sustainable World
- 2013: Energy Efficient and Green Networking
- 2010: Multimedia Applications - Traffic, Performance and QoE
- 2009: Network Virtualization - Concepts and Performance
- 2008: Future Internet Design and Experimental Facilities
- 2008: Quality of Experience
- 2002: Internet Traffic Engineering and Traffic Management

== Arne Jensen Lifetime Achievement Awards ==
The Arne Jensen Lifetime Award has been created in memory of Arne Jensen, Founder of the International Teletraffic Congress (ITC) and Chair of the International Advisory Council (IAC) from its inception in 1955 until 1991. The Award is presented at ITCs to an individual who has provided exceptional contribution to traffic modeling, control and performance, and dedication to the teletraffic community.

- ITC 36 (Trondheim, 2025): Deep Medhi
- ITC 32 (Osaka, 2020): Hiroshi Saito
- ITC 31 (Budapest, 2019): Ulf Körner
- ITC 30 (Vienna, 2018): Luigi Fratta
- ITC 29 (Genoa, 2017): Hans van den Berg
- ITC 28 (Würzburg, 2016): Phuoc Tran-Gia
- ITC 27 (Ghent, 2015): Prosper Chemouil
- ITC 26 (Karlskrona, 2014): Onno J. Boxma
- ITC 25 (Shanghai, 2013): -none-
- ITC 24 (Cracow, 2012): Debasis Mitra
- ITC 23 (San Francisco, 2011): Villy-Baek Iversen
- ITC 22 (Amsterdam, 2010): James W. Roberts
- ITC 21 (Paris, 2009): Paul J. Kühn

Before ITC 21, the Award was referred to as IAC Lifetime Achievement Awards. The prize was established at the ITC 15 in Washington in 1997.

- ITC 20 (Ottawa, 2007): Jim O’Shaughnessy
- ITC 19 (Beijing, 2005): Minoru Akiyama, Clemens Pratt
- ITC 18 (Berlin, 2003): Leendert Cornelis (Leen) Kosten, Pierre Le Gall, Ryszard Syski
- ITC 15 (Washington D.C., 1997): J.W. Cohen, P.J. Burke, Alfred Descloux

== ITC Conferences and Proceedings ==
The proceedings of the ITC conferences are available in the ITC Digital Library: http://itc-conference.org/itc-library.html

Conference	Date	Year	Location	Number of accepted papers
ITC 1	20–23 June	1955	Copenhagen	26
ITC 2	7–11 July	1958	The Hague	31
ITC 3	11–16 September	1961	Paris	48
ITC 4	15–21 July	1964	London	60
ITC 5	14–20 June	1967	New-York	80
ITC 6	9–15 September	1970	Munich	108
ITC 7	13–20 June	1973	Stockholm	130
ITC 8	10–17 November	1976	Melbourne	163
ITC 9	16–24 October	1979	Torremolinos	151
ITC 10	8–15 June	1983	Montreal	86
ITC 11	4–11 September	1985	Kyoto	203
ITC 12	1–8 June	1988	Turin	207
ITC 13	19–26 June	1991	Copenhagen	198
ITC 14	6–10 June	1994	Juan-les-Pins	143
ITC 15	22–27 June	1997	Washington D.C.	138
ITC 16	7–11 June	1999	Edinburgh	131
ITC 17	2–7 December	2001	Salvador da Bahia	98
ITC 18	31 August - 5 September	2003	Berlin	133
ITC 19	29 August - 2 September	2005	Beijing	152
ITC 20	17–21 June	2007	Ottawa	139
ITC 21	15–17 September	2009	Paris	58
ITC 22	7–9 September	2010	Amsterdam	35
ITC 23	6–8 September	2011	San Francisco	38
ITC 24	4–7 September	2012	Cracow	24
ITC 25	10–12 September	2013	Shanghai	32
ITC 26	9–11 September	2014	Karlskrona	27
ITC 27	8–10 September	2015	Ghent	26
ITC 28	12–16 September	2016	Wuerzburg	37
ITC 29	4–8 September	2017	Genoa	28
ITC 30	4–7 September	2018	Vienna	18
ITC 31	27–29 August	2019	Budapest	15
ITC 32	22–24 September	2020	Osaka	20
ITC 33	31 August - 3 September	2021	Avignon	11

== See also ==
- Communication
- Teletraffic engineering
- Global Communications Conference

== Sources ==
- Official ITC website
