= Bianca Schroeder =

Computer scientist

Bianca Schroeder is a computer scientist whose research concerns the reliability of data storage devices and the effects of data faults on high performance computing. Educated in Germany, Ireland, and the US, she works in Canada as a professor and Canada Research Chair at the University of Toronto.

== Education and career ==
Schroeder studied computer science at Saarland University in Germany, with a year in Ireland as an exchange student at the University of Limerick. She earned a master's degree in 1999, under the joint supervision of Kurt Mehlhorn and Susanne Albers. Next, she went to Carnegie Mellon University in the US, where she completed her Ph.D. in 2005. Her dissertation, Improving the Performance of Static and Dynamic Requests at a Busy Web Site, was advised by Mor Harchol-Balter.

Shroeder remained at Carnegie Mellon University for two years as a postdoctoral researcher with Garth Gibson before taking a faculty position at the University of Toronto. Schroeder was given a Tier 2 Canada Research Chair in Reliable and Efficient Data Centres in 2014, renewed in 2019. She is a professor in the Department of Computer and Mathematical Sciences of the University of Toronto,

== Recognition ==
Schroeder was a 2013 recipient of the Outstanding Early Career Computer Science Researcher Award of Computer Science Canada/Informatique Canada. She was awarded a Sloan Research Fellowship in 2013.

Her research has won two USENIX test of time awards. At FAST 2019, she was given the award for a 2007 paper with Garth Gibson entitled "Disk Failures in the Real World: What Does an MTTF of 1,000,000 Hours Mean to You?". At FAST 2022, she was awarded a second time for her 2008 paper "An Analysis of Data Corruption in the Storage Stack", written with Lakshmi N. Bairavasundaram, Garth Goodson, Andrea Arpaci-Dusseau, and Remzi Arpaci-Dusseau.
