= Aurelie Thiele =

French professor of engineering

Aurelie or Aurélie Thiele is a French engineering and decision-making professor. She is an associate professor in the engineering management and information and systems department at the Lyle School of Engineering of Southern Methodist University.

== Education ==
Aurelie Thiele completed a diplôme d'Ingénieur summa cum laude with a concentration in systems and control at Mines ParisTech in 1999. Her thesis was titled "Synthesis of control laws using Lyapunov functions for devices with strapdown guidance systems." Thiele's thesis advisors were Laurent Praly and Hélène Piet-Lahanier. She completed a Master of Science in electrical engineering and computer science in 2000 at the Massachusetts Institute of Technology (MIT). She completed a thesis titled "Potential-driven flows in capacitated networks" with advisor George Varghese. In 2004, Thiele earned a doctor of philosophy in electrical engineering and computer science at MIT. Her dissertation was titled "A robust optimization approach to supply chains and revenue management." Her doctoral advisor was Dimitris Bertsimas.

== Career ==
From 2004 to 2010, Thiele was an assistant professor of industrial and systems engineering at Lehigh University. She was an associate professor at Lehigh University from 2010 to 2016. She joined the faculty at Southern Methodist University (SMU) as an associate professor in the department of engineering management information and systems in the Lyle School of Engineering. Beginning in 2013, Thiele is a certified healthcare financial professional by the Healthcare Financial Management Association.

== Research ==
Thiele's research at Lehigh University included the use of optimization algorithms to control costs in the healthcare industry. At SMU, she researches decision making in times of uncertainty focusing on robust optimization. She is also studying robust revenue management using choice models. Thiele is interested in predictive and prescriptive analytics.

== Other activities ==
Thiele is also a blogger.

== Selected works ==
- Bertsimas, Dimitris; Thiele, Aurélie (2006). "A Robust Optimization Approach to Inventory Theory". Operations Research. 54 (1): 150–168. doi:10.1287/opre.1050.0238. ISSN 0030-364X.
- Gabrel, Virginie; Murat, Cécile; Thiele, Aurélie (2014). "Recent advances in robust optimization: An overview". European Journal of Operational Research. 235 (3): 471–483. doi:10.1016/j.ejor.2013.09.036. ISSN 0377-2217.
- Bertsimas, Dimitris; Thiele, Aurélie (2004). "A Robust Optimization Approach to Supply Chain Management". In Bienstock, Daniel; Nemhauser, George (eds.). Integer Programming and Combinatorial Optimization. Lecture Notes in Computer Science. Vol. 3064. Springer Berlin Heidelberg. pp. 86–100. doi:10.1007/978-3-540-25960-2_7. ISBN 978-3-540-25960-2.
- Bertsimas, Dimitris; Thiele, Aurélie (2006-09-01), "Robust and Data-Driven Optimization: Modern Decision Making Under Uncertainty", Models, Methods, and Applications for Innovative Decision Making, INFORMS TutORials in Operations Research, INFORMS, pp. 95–122, doi:10.1287/educ.1063.0022, ISBN 978-1-877640-20-9
- Thiele, Aurelie; al, et (2010). Robust Linear Optimization With Recourse.
