= Wim Cohen =

Dutch mathematician (1923–2000)

- Born: August 27, 1923; Leeuwarden
- Died: November 12, 2000 (aged 77)
- Resting place: Haifa
- Education: Delft University
- Scientific career
- Fields: Queueing theory
- Workplaces: Philips; University of Utrecht; Delft University
- Thesis: On stress calculations in helicoidal shells and propeller blades (1955)
- Doctoral advisor: Warner T. Koiter
- Doctoral students: Onno Boxma

Jacob Willem "Wim" Cohen (27 August 1923 Leeuwarden – 12 November 2000) was a Dutch mathematician, well known for over hundred scientific publications and several books in queueing theory.

Cohen was born in a Jewish family, as the son of Benjamin Cohen and Aaltje Klein. Having acquired an autodidact knowledge of mathematics while in hiding during World War II, Cohen got an Engineer's degree (1949) and Ph.D. degree (1955) in mechanical engineering at Delft University, on a dissertation titled Stress Calculations in Helicoidal Shells and Propeller Blades. He worked as teletraffic engineer with the Telecommunications group at Philips (1950–57), at the applied mathematics department at Delft (1957–73) and University of Utrecht (1973-1998). He was buried in Haifa.

== Books ==
- The single server queue (1969)
- Statistical Power Analysis for the Behavioural Sciences (Academic Press, 1969)
- On regenerative processes in queueing theory
- Boundary value problems in queueing systems (Elsevier, 1983). Editor with Onno J. Boxma.
- Analysis of random walks (IOS Press, 1992)

== Awards ==
- Hollandsche Maatschappij der Wetenschappen AKZO prize (1986)
- honorary doctorate from the Technion (1988)
- honorary member of the International Advisory Committee of the International Teletraffic Congress.
- ITC Lifetime Achievement Award by the International Advisory Committee of the International Teletraffic Congress (1997).
