= Peter Vogel (banker) =

Polish banker and murderer

Piotr Filipczyński or Peter Vogel (born 1954 in Warsaw) is a convicted Polish murderer and later banker in Switzerland.

In 1971, he was sentenced to 25 years of jail for a brutal murder (shortened to 15 years in 1979). Surprisingly enough, in 1983 (during the martial law in Poland) he was granted a passport and allowed to leave the country. He returned in 1990 soon earning the nickname "the accountant of the Left" as a former Swiss banker who took care of more than thirty accounts of Polish social democrats. Despite an arrest warrant issued in 1987, Vogel moved freely in Poland and was eventually arrested in 1998 in Switzerland. After Vogel's extradition to Poland, in 1999 Aleksander Kwaśniewski initiated the procedure of granting him amnesty. In December 2005 (a few days before leaving his office) Kwaśniewski pardoned Vogel despite the negative opinion of the prosecutor.

Politicians linked to Marek Dochnal reportedly had Swiss bank accounts handled by Peter Vogel.
