= Devavrat Shah =

Professor at MIT

- Education: Indian Institute of Technology Bombay; Stanford University
- Known for: Mathematical Modelling and Analysis in Computer science and Operations Research
- Scientific career
- Fields: Computer Science, Operations Research
- Workplaces: MIT
- Thesis: Randomization and Heavy Traffic Theory: New Approaches for Design and Analysis of Switch Algorithms (2004)
- Doctoral advisor: Balaji Prabakhar

Devavrat Shah is a professor in the Electrical Engineering and Computer Science department at MIT. He is director of the Statistics and Data Science Center at MIT. He received a B.Tech. degree in computer science from IIT Bombay in 1999 and a Ph.D. in computer science from Stanford University in 2004, where his thesis was completed under the supervision of Balaji Prabhakar.

== Research ==
Shah's research focuses on the theory of large complex networks which includes network algorithms, stochastic networks, network information theory and large scale statistical inference. His work has had significant impact both in the development of theoretical tools and in its practical application. This is highlighted by the "Best Paper" awards he has received from top publication venues such as ACM SIGMETRICS, IEEE INFOCOM and NIPS. Additionally, his work has been recognized by the INFORMS Applied Probability Society via the Erlang Prize, given for outstanding contributions to applied probability by a researcher not more than 9 years from their PhD and the ACM SIGMETRICS Rising Star award, given for outstanding contributions to computer/communication performance evaluation by a research not more than 7 years from their PhD. He is a young distinguished alumnus of his alma mater IIT Bombay.

== Awards ==
Shah has received many awards, including

- Erlang Prize from Applied Probability Society of INFORMS 2010
- ACM SIGMETRICS/Performance best student paper award 2009 (supervised)
- ACM SIGMETRICS Rising Star Award 2008
- Neural Information Processing System (NIPS) outstanding paper award 2008 (supervised)
- ACM SIGMETRICS/Performance best paper award 2006
- NSF CAREER Award 2006
- George B. Dantzig best dissertation award from INFORMS 2005
- IEEE INFOCOM best paper award 2004
- President of India Gold Medal at Indian Institute of Technology-Bombay 1999

== Industry ==
Shah co-founded Celect, Inc. in 2013.
