= Steven E. Shreve =

American mathematician

Steven Eugene Shreve is a mathematician and a University Professor Emeritus in the Department of Mathematical Sciences at Carnegie Mellon University. He was previously the Orion Hoch Professor of Mathematical Sciences, which he held from 2006 until his retirement. Shreve is also the author of several major books on the mathematics of financial derivatives.

His first degree, awarded in 1972 was in German from West Virginia University. He then studied mathematics at Georg-August-Universität Göttingen. He then took a Masters in Electrical Engineering at the University of Illinois, where he completed a PhD in mathematics in 1977.

Shreve joined the Carnegie Mellon faculty in 1980 and helped establish the university's bachelor's, master's and doctoral programs in computational and mathematical finance. In 2013, Carnegie Mellon named him a University Professor, the university's highest faculty distinction.

His textbook Stochastic Calculus for Finance is used by numerous graduate programs in quantitative finance. The book was voted "Best New Book in Quantitative Finance" in 2004 by members of Wilmott website, and has been highly praised by scholars in the field. Shreve is a Fellow of the Institute of Mathematical Statistics.

== Books ==
- Stochastic Optimal Control: The Discrete Time Case with Dimitri P. Bertsekas, Academic Press, 1978.
- Brownian Motion and Stochastic Calculus with Ioannis Karatzas Springer-Verlag, 2nd Ed. 1991.
- Methods of Mathematical Finance with Ioannis Karatzas Springer-Verlag, 1998
- Stochastic Calculus for Finance. Volume I: The Binomial Asset Pricing Model
- Volume II: Continuous-Time Models Springer-Verlag, 2004

The most recent volume was awarded "New Book of the Year" by Wilmott magazine.
