= Mark Crovella =

American computer scientist

Mark Crovella is an American computer scientist and Professor at Boston University. His research focuses on computer networks as well as data science. Much of his work has focused on improving the understanding, design, and performance of parallel and networked computer systems, mainly through the application of measurement, data mining, statistics, and performance evaluation. In the computer science arena, he has focused on the analysis of social, biological, and communication networks. He is co-author of the first text on Internet Measurement, Internet Measurement: Infrastructure, Traffic, and Applications. In 2010 he was one of the inaugural winners of the ACM SIGMETRICS Test of Time awards, which recognize "an influential performance evaluation paper whose impact is still felt 10–12 years after its initial publication." He was named ACM Fellow in 2010, and Fellow of the Institute of Electrical and Electronics Engineers (IEEE) in 2012, in both cases "for contributions to the measurement and analysis of networks and distributed systems". He served as chair of ACM SIGCOMM from 2007 to 2009, and he served as Chair of the Department of Computer Science at Boston University from 2013 to 2018.
