= David Gamarnik =

Professor of operations research at MIT

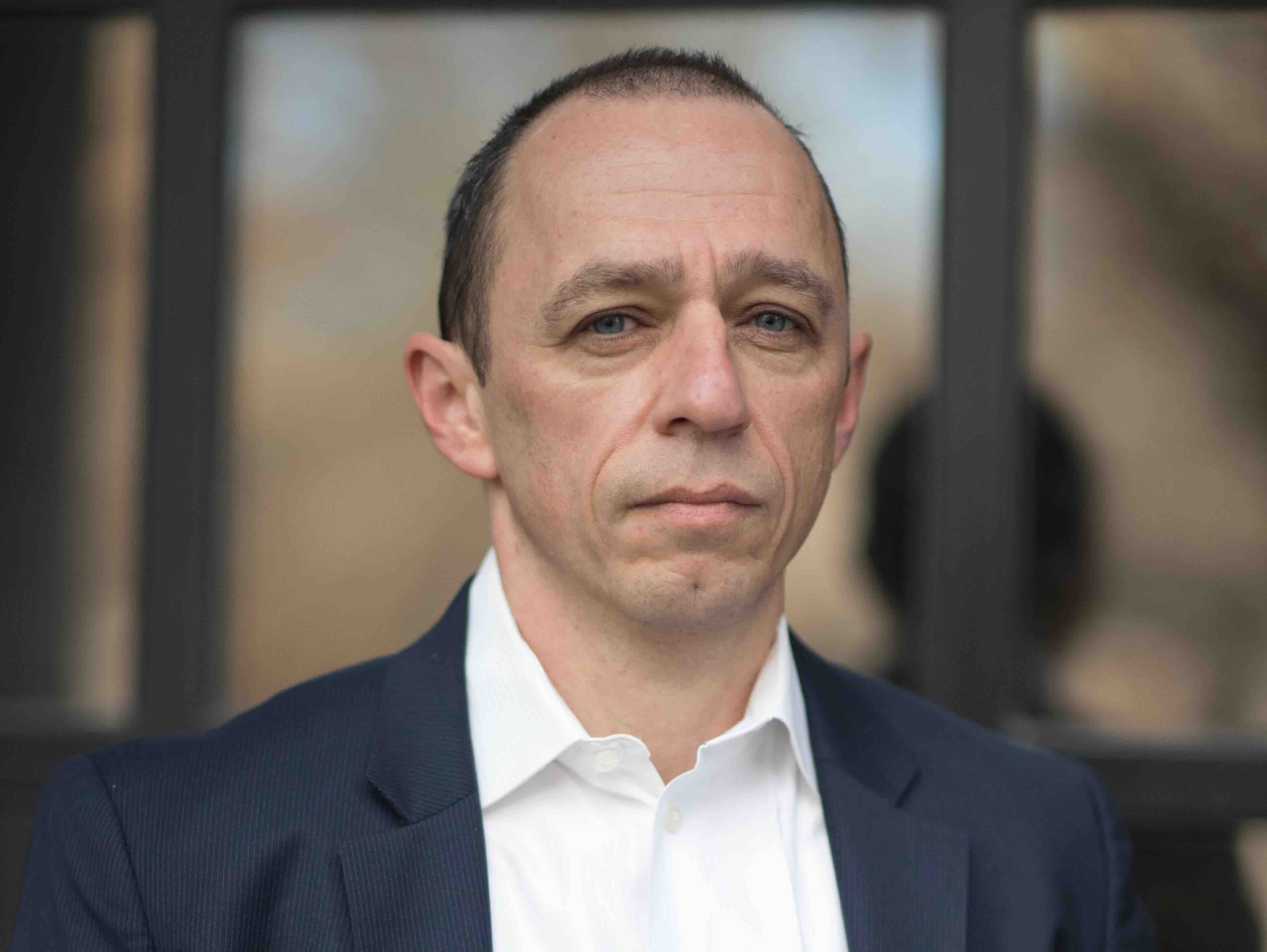
- Education: Massachusetts Institute of Technology (PhD); New York University (BA)
- Awards: Erlang Prize (2004); INFORMS Applied Probability Society Best Publication Award (2011); INFORMS Franz Edelman Prize Laureate (2014); Fellow of INFORMS (2021); Fellow of the AMS (2022); Fellow of the IMS (2023)
- Scientific career
- Fields: Operations Research, Applied probability, Stochastic Processes, Algorithms, Optimization, Random graphs, Quantum systems, Quantum computing
- Workplaces: Massachusetts Institute of Technology
- Thesis: Stability and Performance of Multiclass Queueing Networks (1998)
- Doctoral advisor: John Tsitsiklis; Dimitris Bertsimas

David Gamarnik is an American applied mathematician, and a Nanyang Technological University Professor in the Operations Research and Statistics Group at the Massachusetts Institute of Technology's Sloan School of Management. His research spans discrete probability, statistics and machine learning, algorithms and optimization, quantum computing, stochastic processes and queueing theory.

== Early life and education ==
Gamarnik was born in Tbilisi, Georgia and completed part of his undergraduate studies at Tbilisi State University in 1990. He received a B.A. in mathematics from New York University, Courant Institute of Mathematical Sciences in 1993. He received his Ph.D. in Operations Research from MIT in 1998, with a dissertation titled Stability and Performance of Multiclass Queueing Networks.

== Career ==
Gamarnik worked as a research staff member at IBM Thomas J. Watson Research Center (1997–2005). He joined the MIT Sloan School of Management in 2005, serving as an Assistant Professor (2005–2007), Associate Professor (2007–2012), and full Professor (since 2012).

He has written over 150 scientific publications and a textbook, and made profound contributions to numerous domains, including discrete probability, random structures, algorithms and combinatorial optimization, statistics and machine learning, quantum computing, stochastic processes, as well as queueing theory.

Along with Madhu Sudan, he introduced Overlap Gap Property, a new method for understanding average-case complexity, based on theory of spin glasses.

He has served in editorial roles (area editor/associate editor) for premier operations research and applied probability journals, including Mathematics of Operations Research, the Annals of Applied Probability, Queueing Systems, Stochastic Systems, and Operations Research.

== Awards and honors ==
Gamarnik has received multiple honors and awards from professional societies, including:

- Erlang Prize (Applied Probability Society of INFORMS, 2004)
- INFORMS Applied Probability Society Best Publication Award (2011)
- INFORMS Franz Edelman Prize Laureate (2014)
- Fellow of INFORMS (2021)
- Fellow of the American Mathematical Society (Class of 2022)
- Fellow of the Institute of Mathematical Statistics (2023)

== Books ==
- Queueing Theory: Classical and Modern Methods, 2022.
