= John Tsitsiklis =

Greek-American probabilist

John N. Tsitsiklis
- Born: 1958 (age 67–68); Thessaloniki, Greece
- Known for: Dynamic programming Stochastic systems Operations Research; Numerical analysis Statistical learning Q-learning; Optimization; Statistics
- Awards: 2018 INFORMS John von Neumann Theory Prize; 2018 IEEE Control Systems Award; 2016 ACM SIGMETRICS Achievement Award; 1997 ICS Prize
- Scientific career
- Fields: Electrical engineering
- Workplaces: MIT
- Doctoral advisor: Michael Athans
- Doctoral students: George W. Hart; Ioannis Paschalidis; David Tse; C.-C. Jay Kuo; Zhi-Quan Tom Luo; David Gamarnik

John Nikolaos Tsitsiklis (Greek: Γιάννης Ν. Τσιτσικλής; born 1958) is a Greek-American probabilist. He is the Clarence J. Lebel Professor of Electrical Engineering with the Department of Electrical Engineering and Computer Science (EECS) at the Massachusetts Institute of Technology. He serves as the director of the Laboratory for Information and Decision Systems and is affiliated with the Institute for Data, Systems, and Society (IDSS), the Statistics and Data Science Center and the MIT Operations Research Center.

== Education ==
Tsitsiklis received a B.S. degree in Mathematics (1980), and his B.S. (1980), M.S. (1981), and Ph.D. (1984) degrees in Electrical Engineering, all from the Massachusetts Institute of Technology in Cambridge, Massachusetts.

== Awards and honors ==
Tsitsiklis was elected to the 2007 class of Fellows of the Institute for Operations Research and the Management Sciences.

He won the "2016 ACM SIGMETRICS Achievement Award in recognition of his fundamental contributions to decentralized control and consensus, approximate dynamic programming and statistical learning."

In 2018 he won the IEEE Control Systems Award "for contributions to the theory and application of optimization in large dynamic and distributed systems" as well as the John von Neumann Theory Prize, with Dimitri Bertsekas, "for contributions to Parallel and Distributed Computation as well as Neurodynamic Programming."
