= Adam Wierman =

American computer scientist

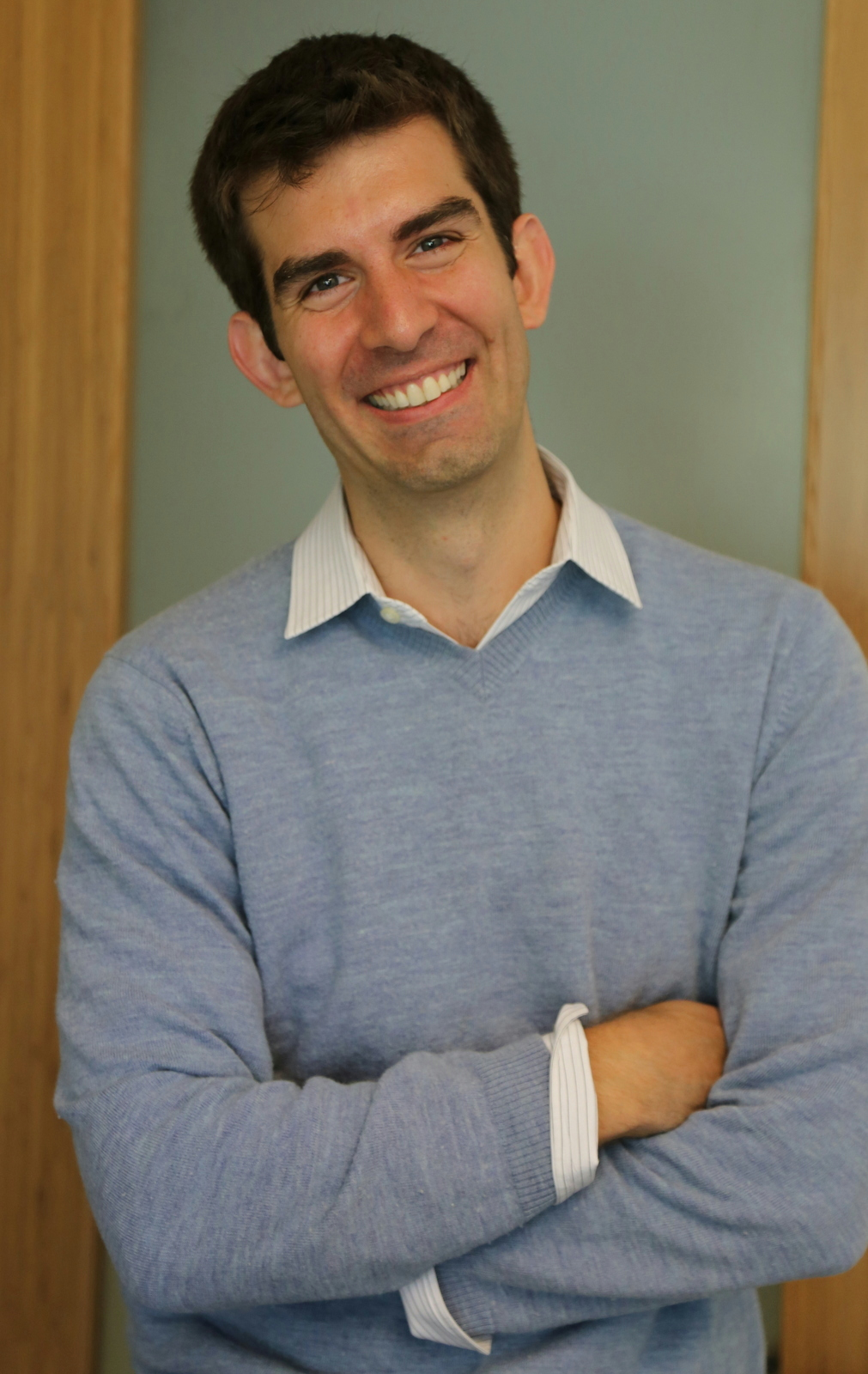
- Born: May 1979 (age 47); Minneapolis, Minnesota
- Education: Carnegie Mellon University
- Known for: Scheduling (computing), Heavy tails, Green computing, Queueing Theory, Algorithmic Game Theory
- Awards: Carnegie Mellon School of Computer Science Distinguished Dissertation Award (2007), ACM SIGMETRICS Rising Star award (2011), IEEE William R. Bennet Prize (2014)
- Scientific career
- Fields: computer science, operations research
- Workplaces: California Institute of Technology
- Thesis: Scheduling for Today's Computer Systems: Bridging Theory and Practice (2007)
- Doctoral advisor: Mor Harchol-Balter
- Website: www.cs.caltech.edu/~adamw/

Adam Wierman is professor of computer science in the Department of Computing and Mathematical Sciences at the California Institute of Technology. He is known for his work on scheduling (computing), heavy tails, green computing, queueing theory, and algorithmic game theory.

== Academic biography ==
Wierman studied at Carnegie Mellon University, where he completed his BS in Computer Science and Mathematics in 2001 and his MS and PhD degrees in Computer Science in 2004 and 2007. His PhD work was supervised by Mor Harchol-Balter. His dissertation received the Carnegie Mellon School of Computer Science Distinguished Dissertation Award. He has been on the faculty of the California Institute of Technology since 2007.

== Research ==
Wierman's research has centred on resource allocation and scheduling decisions in computer systems and services. More specifically, his work has focused both on developing analytic techniques in stochastic modelling, queueing theory, scheduling theory, and game theory, and on applying these techniques to application domains such as energy-efficient computing, data centres, social networks, and electricity markets.

== Awards and honors ==
Wierman was the recipient of an NSF CAREER award in 2009 and the ACM SIGMETRICS Rising Star award in 2011. His work has received "Best Paper" awards at the ACM SIGMETRICS, IEEE INFOCOM, and IFIP Performance conferences, among others. An extension of his work was used in HP's Net-zero Data Center Architecture, which was named a 2013 Computerworld Honours Laureate. His work received the 2014 IEEE William R. Bennet Prize. In 2023, he was named an ACM Distinguished Member. Wierman was named to the 2025 class of ACM Fellows, "for contributions to online algorithms, scheduling theory, and applications to sustainable computing".
