= Dimitris Bertsimas =

Greek-American operations researcher (born 1962)

- Δημήτρης Μπερτσιμάς
- Born: 3 October 1962 (age 63); Alexandroupolis, Greece
- Citizenship: American
- Education: NTUA; MIT
- Awards: Member of the United States National Academy of Engineering von Neumann Theory prize INFORMS President Award; Erlang Prize; Farkas Prize; SIAM Optimization Prize
- Scientific career
- Fields: Optimization
- Workplaces: Massachusetts Institute of Technology
- Thesis: Probabilistic Combinatorial Optimization Problems (1988)
- Doctoral advisor: Daniel J. Kleitman; Amedeo Odoni
- Doctoral students: Michel Goemans; Ioannis Paschalidis; Aurelie Thiele; David Gamarnik

Dimitris John Bertsimas (born 3 October 1962) is an American applied mathematician, and a professor in the Sloan School of Management at the Massachusetts Institute of Technology (MIT), Cambridge, Massachusetts.

In 2005, Bertsimas was elected a member of the National Academy of Engineering for contributions to optimization theory and stochastic systems and innovative applications in financial engineering and transportation.

== Biography ==
Bertsimas was born in Alexandroupolis, Greece and grew up in Athens. He received a Diploma in Electrical Engineering from the National Technical University of Athens, Greece, in 1985 and an MS and PhD in Operations Research at the Massachusetts Institute of Technology in 1987 and 1988 respectively. Since 1988, he has been with the MIT faculty. His research interests include optimization, machine learning and applied probability and their applications in health care, finance, operations management and transportation. He has co-authored more than 250 scientific papers and five graduate level textbooks. He is the editor in Chief of INFORMS Journal on Optimization and former department editor in Optimization for Management Science and in Financial Engineering in Operations Research. He is the founding director of the Masters of Business Analytics at MIT. He is currently the Associate Dean of Business Analytics at MIT's Sloan School Management. He has supervised 81 doctoral students and he is currently supervising 25 others. He has been a serial entrepreneur in the areas of financial services, health care, education, machine learning and transportation.

== Awards and honors ==
- INFORMS Fellow.
- INFORMS Frederic W. Lanchester prize
- INFORMS von Neumann Theory Prize
- INFORMS President Award
- INFORMS Farkas Prize
- INFORMS Erlang Prize
- SIAM Optimization Prize.
- Member of National Academy of Engineering.

== Textbooks ==
- Robust and Adaptive Optimization, 2022.
- Machine Learning Under a Modern Optimization Lens, 2019.
- The Analytics Edge, 2016.
- Introduction to Linear Optimization, 2008.
- Optimization Over Integers, 2005.
- Data, Models, and Decisions, 2004.

== See also ==
- Optimization (mathematics)
