= Kwaśniewski =

Kwaśniewski (feminine Kwaśniewska, plural Kwaśniewscy) is the surname of:

- Aleksander Kwaśniewski (born 1954), Polish politician and journalist
- Aleksandra Kwaśniewska (born 1978), Polish singer-songwriter
- Dorota Kwaśniewska (born 1970), Polish teacher and politician
- Dylan Kwasniewski (born 1995), American auto racing driver
- Jan Kwaśniewski (1937–2019), Polish physician
- Janina Kwaśniewska (1928–2011), Polish female sailor
- Jerzy Kwaśniewski (1942–2023), Polish sociologist
- Jolanta Kwaśniewska (born 1955), Polish lawyer and charity activist
- Krzysztof Kwaśniewski (born 1927), Polish sociologist
- Maria Kwaśniewska (1913–2007), Polish athlete
- Mikołaj Kwaśniewski (1871–1941), Polish politician
- Paweł Kwaśniewski (born 1963), Polish contemporary artist, performer
- Rafał Kwaśniewski (born 1966), Polish rock guitarist/singer, songwriter
- Stanisław Kwaśniewski (1886–1956), Brigadier General WP
- Stefan Kwaśniewski (1898–1944), journalist, columnist, a member of the Warsaw Uprising
- Walenty Kwaśniewski (1752–1813), Brigadier General WP
- Wiesława Kwaśniewska (born 1933), Polish actress
- Włodzimierz Kwaśniewski, official of the Second Republic, connected with Lviv
- Zbigniew Kwaśniewski (1948–2017), Polish footballer

It sometimes takes the form Quasniewski, especially in German-speaking areas.
