= SIGMETRICS =

ACM's Special Interest Group on Measurement and Evaluation

SIGMETRICS is the Association for Computing Machinery's Special Interest Group on Measurement and Evaluation, which specializes in the field of performance analysis, measurement, and modeling of computer systems. It is also the name of an annual 'flagship' conference, organized by SIGMETRICS since 1973, which is considered to be the leading conference in performance analysis and modeling in the world. Known to have an extremely competitive acceptance rate (~15%), many of the landmark works in the area have been published through it.

Beyond the flagship conference, SIGMETRICS also promotes research into performance evaluation through a number of other activities. It co-sponsors other prestigious conferences: the Internet Measurement Conference (IMC), the International Conference on Performance Engineering (ICPE), the IEEE/ACM Symposium on Quality of Service (IWQoS), the ACM International Conference on Systems for Energy-Efficient Built Environments (BuildSys), and the ACM Conference on Embedded Network Sensor Systems (SenSys). In addition, every third year the SIGMETRICS conference is held jointly with IFIP performance. Additionally, SIGMETRICS produces a newsletter, Performance Evaluation Review, with both peer-reviewed and editorial content.

SIGMETRICS has four awards that are given out on an annual basis:

- The SIGMETRICS Achievement Award, which recognizes a senior researcher who has made long-lasting influential contributions to computer/communication performance evaluation.
- The SIGMETRICS Rising Star Award, which recognizes a junior researcher who demonstrates outstanding potential for research in computer/communication performance evaluation.
- The SIGMETRICS Test of Time Award, which recognizes an influential SIGMETRICS paper from 10–12 years previously.
- The SIGMETRICS Doctoral Dissertation Award, which recognizes excellent thesis research by doctoral candidates.

== History ==
The group was formed as SIGME (Special Interest Committee on Measurement and Evaluation) in 1971, the name was changed to SIGMETRICS in 1972.

== Awards ==
Each year the group gives three awards, the lifetime achievement award, rising star award and test of time award.

=== Achievement award ===
The achievement award is given each year to an individual who has made "long-lasting, influential contributions to the theory or practice of computer/communication system performance evaluation."

- 2003 Edward G. Coffman, Jr.
- 2004 Ken C. Sevcik
- 2005 Stephen S. Lavenberg
- 2006 Richard R. Muntz
- 2007 Don Towsley
- 2008 Erol Gelenbe
- 2009 Frank Kelly
- 2010 Jeffrey P. Buzen
- 2011 Onno J. Boxma
- 2012 Debasis Mitra
- 2013 Jean Walrand
- 2014 François Baccelli
- 2015 Bruce Hajek
- 2016 John Tsitsiklis
- 2017 Sem Borst
- 2018 Jim Dai
- 2019 Mary K. Vernon
- 2020 Leandros Tassiulas
- 2021 R. Srikant
- 2022 Balaji Prabhakar
- 2023 Laurent Massoulié
- 2024 Marco Ajmone Marsan
- 2025 Devavrat Shah
- 2026 Alexandre Proutière

=== Rising Star Research Award ===
The Rising Star Research Award is given each year to an individual who "demonstrates outstanding potential for research in the field of computer and communication performance."

- 2008 Devavrat Shah
- 2009 Alexandre Proutiere
- 2010 Milan Vojnovic
- 2011 Adam Wierman
- 2012 Marc Lelarge
- 2013 Augustin Chaintreau
- 2014 Florian Simatos
- 2015 Jinwoo Shin
- 2016 Yi Lu
- 2017 Sewoong Oh
- 2018 Longbo Huang
- 2019 Anshul Gandhi
- 2020 Kuang Xu
- 2021 Zhenhua Liu
- 2022 Giulia Fanti
- 2023 Weina Wang
- 2024 Christina Lee Yu
- 2025 Debankur Mukherjee
- 2026 Sangeetha Abdu Jyothi

=== Test of Time Award ===
The Test of Time Award is given annually to the authors of papers whose "impact is still felt 10–12 years after its initial publication."

==== 2010 ====
- Buzen, Jeffrey P. "Fundamental Laws of Computer System Performance". SIGMETRICS 1976. doi:10.1145/800200.806196.
- Eager, Derek; Lazowska, Ed; Zahorjan, John. "A Comparison of Receiver-initiated and Sender-initiated Adaptive Load Sharing". SIGMETRICS 1985. doi:10.1145/317795.317802.
- Crovella, Mark E.; Bestavros, Azer. "Self-similarity in World Wide Web Traffic: Evidence and Possible Causes" (PDF). SIGMETRICS 1996. doi:10.1145/233013.233038.

==== 2011 ====
- Chu, Yang-hua; Rao, Sanjay; Zhang, Hui. "A Case for End System Multicast" (PDF). SIGMETRICS 2000. doi:10.1145/339331.339337.
- Gao, Lixin; Rexford, Jennifer. "Stable Internet Routing without Global Coordination" (PDF). SIGMETRICS 2000. doi:10.1145/339331.339426.

==== 2012 ====
- Bu, T.; Duffield, N.; Presti, F. L.; Towsley, D. "Network tomography on general topologies" (PDF). SIGMETRICS 2002. doi:10.1145/511334.511338.

==== 2013 ====
- Zhang, Y.; Roughan, M.; Duffield, N.; Greenberg, A. "Fast Accurate Computation of Large-Scale IP Traffic Matrices from Link Loads" (PDF). SIGMETRICS 2003. doi:10.1145/885651.781053.

==== 2014 ====
- Blackburn, S.; Cheng, P.; McKinley, K. "Myths and realities: the performance impact of garbage collection". SIGMETRICS 2004. doi:10.1145/1005686.1005693.

==== 2015 ====
- Moore, A.; Zuev, D. "Internet traffic classification using bayesian analysis techniques". SIGMETRICS 2005. doi:10.1145/1064212.1064220.

==== 2016 ====
- Urgaonkar, B.; Pacifici, G.; Shenoy, P.; Spreitzer, M.; Tantawi, A. "An analytical model for multi-tier internet services and its applications". SIGMETRICS 2005. doi:10.1145/1064212.1064252.

==== 2017 ====
- Bairavasundaram, L. N.; Goodson, G. R.; Pasupathy, S.; Schindler, J. "An analysis of latent sector errors in disk drives". SIGMETRICS 2007. doi:10.1145/1269899.1254917.

==== 2018 ====
- Lu, Y.; Montanari, A.; Prabhakar, B.; Dharmapurikar, S.; Kabbani, A. "Counter braids: a novel counter architecture for per-flow measurement". SIGMETRICS 2008. doi:10.1145/1384529.1375472.

==== 2019 ====
- Rajagopalan, S.; Shah, D.; Shin, J. "Network adiabatic theorem: an efficient randomized protocol for contention resolution". SIGMETRICS/Performance 2009. doi:10.1145/2492101.1555365.

==== 2020 ====
- Shah, D.; Zaman, T. "Detecting sources of computer viruses in networks: theory and experiment". SIGMETRICS 2010. doi:10.1145/1811039.1811063.

==== 2021 ====
- Liu, Z.; Lin, M.; Wierman, A.; Low, S.; Andrew, L.L.H. "Greening Geographical Load Balancing". SIGMETRICS 2011. doi:10.1145/1993744.1993767. hdl:1959.3/199309.

==== 2022 ====
- Atikoglu, B.; Xu, Y.; Frachtenberg, E.; Jiang, S.; Paleczny, M. "Workload analysis of a large-scale key-value store". SIGMETRICS/Performance 2012. doi:10.1145/2318857.2254766.

==== 2023 ====
- Kim, M.; Sumbaly, R.; Shah, S. "Root Cause Detection in a Service-Oriented Architecture". SIGMETRICS 2013. doi:10.1145/2494232.2465753.

==== 2024 ====
- Viennot, N.; Garcia, E.; Nieh, J. "A Measurement Study of Google Play". SIGMETRICS 2014. doi:10.1145/2591971.2592003.

==== 2025 ====
- Combes, R.; Magureanu, S.; Proutiere, A.; Laroche, C. "Learning to Rank: Regret Lower Bounds and Efficient Algorithms". SIGMETRICS 2015. doi:10.1145/2745844.2745852.

==== 2026 ====
- Ying, L. "On the Approximation Error of Mean-Field Models". SIGMETRICS 2016. doi:10.1145/2896377.2901463.

=== Doctoral Dissertation award ===
The doctoral dissertation award is given each year to an individual to recognize excellent thesis research by doctoral candidates in the field of performance evaluation analysis of computer systems.

- 2022 Ziv Scully
- 2023 Isaac Grosof
- 2024 Sushil Varma
- 2025 Weizhao Tang
- 2026 Yige Hong
