= Onno J. Boxma =

Dutch mathematician (born 1952)

- Born: 1952 (age 73–74); The Hague, the Netherlands
- Scientific career
- Fields: Mathematician
- Workplaces: Technische Universiteit Eindhoven
- Thesis: Analysis of Models for Tandem Queues (1977)
- Doctoral advisor: Wim Cohen

Onno Johan Boxma (born 1952) is a Dutch mathematician, and Professor at the Eindhoven University of Technology, known for several contributions to queueing theory and applied probability theory.

== Biography ==
Born in The Hague, Boxma earned his B.Sc. in Mathematics at Delft University of Technology in 1974, and his Ph.D. cum laude in Mathematic from Utrecht University in 1977 on the dissertation entitled "Analysis of Models for Tandem Queues", advised by Wim Cohen.

Boxma continued at Utrecht as faculty from 1974 to 1985, and was IBM Research postdoctoral fellow in 1978–79, before joining the faculty of Centrum Wiskunde & Informatica in Amsterdam. There he chaired the performance analysis group until 1998. He was full professor at University of Tilburg from 1987 to 1988. and since 1998 he is as full professor holding the chair of Stochastic Operations Research in the Department of Mathematics and Computer Science at Technische Universiteit Eindhoven, becoming vice dean of the department in 2009.

He was the editor-in-chief of Queueing Systems from 2004 to 2009, and scientific director of EURANDOM from 2005-2010. In 2009 he was awarded an honorary degree by the University of Haifa (Israel), and received the 2011 ACM SIGMETRICS Achievement Award in June 2011. Also, he is honorary professor in Heriot-Watt University, Edinburgh, UK (2008-2010 and 2011-2013).

== Work ==
Boxma's research focuses on the field of applied probability and stochastic operations, particularly of queueing theory and its application to the performance analysis of computer, communication and production systems.

== Publications ==
Books, a selection:

- 1977. Analysis of Models for Tandem Queues. Doctoral thesis Utrecht University.
- 1983. Boundary Value Problems in Queueing System Analysis. Editor with Wim Cohen

Articles, a selection:

- Boxma, Onno J., and Hans Daduna. "Sojourn times in queueing networks." CWI. Department of Operations Research, Statistics, and System Theory [BS] R 8916 (1989): 1-47.
- Boxma, Onno J. "Workloads and waiting times in single-server systems with multiple customer classes." Queueing Systems 5.1-3 (1989): 185-214.
- Cohen, Jacob Willem, and Onno J. Boxma. Boundary value problems in queueing system analysis. Elsevier, 2000.
- Albrecher, Hansjörg, and Onno J. Boxma. "A ruin model with dependence between claim sizes and claim intervals." Insurance: Mathematics and Economics 35.2 (2004): 245-254.
