= Ioannis Paschalidis =

Greek electrical engineer, and professor

Ioannis (Yannis) C. Paschalidis (born 1968; Athens, Greece) is a distinguished professor of engineering, with appointments in electrical & computer engineering, systems engineering, and biomedical engineering; a founding faculty member of the Faculty of Computing & Data Sciences; and a professor of biostatistics in the School of Public Health at Boston University. He also serves as director of the Rafik B. Hariri Institute for Computing and Computational Science & Engineering, the University's largest interdisciplinary research hub, which fosters multidisciplinary research in computing, artificial intelligence, and data science across all BU schools and colleges. Previously, Paschalidis served as director of Boston University's Center for Information & Systems Engineering (CISE)—an interdisciplinary research center that focuses on the study and design of intelligent systems—from 2014 to 2022, following nearly a decade as its co-director from 2004 to 2013.

== Biography ==
Paschalidis received a diploma degree in electrical engineering from the National Technical University of Athens, Greece, in 1991, and an M.S. and Ph.D. in electrical engineering and computer science from the Massachusetts Institute of Technology (MIT) in 1993 and 1996, respectively. His doctoral thesis was on "Large Deviations in High-Speed Communication Networks" supervised by Dimitris Bertsimas and John Tsitsiklis. In September 1996, he joined the Boston University College of Engineering, where he has been ever since. He has held visiting appointments at Columbia University and MIT. His research interests lie in the fields of optimization, control, stochastic systems, machine learning, computational medicine, and computational biology. He has published a monograph and more than 220 refereed papers in these topics, and he has been the primary advisor to 26 Ph.D. theses.

== Awards and honors ==
- Founding Editor-in-Chief, IEEE Transactions on Control of Network Systems, 2013–2019.
- Best Paper, Clinical Research Informatics, International Medical Informatics Association (IMIA), 2019.
- Best Paper Award, Finalist, IEEE International Conference on Robotics and Automation (ICRA), 2016.
- Invited participant, Keck Futures Initiative, National Academies, 2014.
- Fellow of the Institute of Electrical and Electronics Engineers in 2014, "for contributions to the control and optimization of communication and sensor networks, manufacturing systems, and biological systems".
- Invited Participant, Frontiers of Engineering Symposium, National Academy of Engineering, 2002.
- National Science Foundation CAREER Award, 2000.
- George Nicholson Student Paper Competition by INFORMS, Second Place, 1997.
