= International Advisory Council =

The International Advisory Council (IAC) rules the International Teletraffic Congress (ITC). ITC was created in 1955 by Arne Jensen to initially cater to the emerging need to understand and model traffic in telephone networks using stochastic methodologies, and to bring together researchers with these considerations as a common theme. Over the years, it has broaden its scope to address a wide spectrum ranging from the mathematical theory of traffic processes, stochastic system modelling and analysis, traffic and performance measurements, network management, teletraffic engineering to network capacity planning and cost optimization, including network economics and reliability for various types of networks.

The IAC gathers a number of technical experts, from universities and the research arms of key corporations in the industry, from countries having a strong tradition in teletraffic development. The IAC responsibilities are to disseminate information on teletraffic which is of interest for the whole community and:

- to select the locations of Plenary Congresses and to ensure their high-level technical programme;
- to support Specialist Seminars on specific topics of current interest;

ITC congresses were organized on most continents. That time ITU was the leading standardization in telecommunications. The long tradition of ITC in connection with ITU fostered the liaison activity in standardization and in the development program.

== List of IAC Chairpersons ==
- Arne Jensen: 1955-1991
- Paul Kuehn: 1991-2007. He was elected in 1991 in Copenhagen, after Arne Jensen.
- Prosper Chemouil: 2007-2015. He was elected in 2007 at ITC 20 in Ottawa and chaired his first IAC meeting in 2009 at ITC 21 in Paris.
- Michela Meo: 2015–present. She is the current IAC chairperson.
