= Queueing Systems =

- Discipline: Queueing theory
- Language: English
- Edited by: Sergey Foss

Publication details
- History: 1986-present
- Publisher: Springer Science+Business Media
- Frequency: 12/year
- Impact factor: 0.7 (2024)

Standard abbreviations
- ISO 4: Queueing Syst.

Indexing
- ISSN: 0257-0130 (print); 1572-9443 (web)
- OCLC no.: 42939100

Links
- Journal homepage; Online access

Queueing Systems is a peer-reviewed scientific journal covering queueing theory. It is published by Springer Science+Business Media. The current editor-in-chief is Sergey Foss. According to the Journal Citation Reports, the journal has a 2019 impact factor of 1.114.

== Editors-in-chief ==
N. U. Prabhu was the founding editor-in-chief when the journal was established in 1986 and remained editor until 1995. Richard F. Serfozo was editor from 1996 to 2004, and Onno J. Boxma from 2004 to 2009. Since 2009, the editor has been Sergey Foss.

== Abstracting and indexing ==
Queueing Systems is abstracted and indexed in DBLP, Journal Citation Reports, Mathematical Reviews, Research Papers in Economics, SCImago Journal Rank, Scopus, Science Citation Index, Zentralblatt MATH, among others.
