= Zhi-Quan Tom Luo =

- Zhiquan Luo
- Born: 罗智泉; November, 1963; Nanchang, Jiangxi, China
- Citizenship: Canada
- Education: MIT; Peking University
- Scientific career
- Fields: Mathematical optimization Signal processing
- Institutions: The Chinese University of Hong Kong, Shenzhen; University of Minnesota; McMaster University
- Thesis: Communication complexity of some problems in distributed computation (1989)
- Doctoral advisor: John N. Tsitsiklis

Zhi-Quan (Tom) Luo (simplified Chinese: 罗智泉; traditional Chinese: 羅智泉; pinyin: Luó Zhìquán; born November 1963) is a Canadian computational and mathematical scientist.

Luo currently serves as the Vice President (Academic) of The Chinese University of Hong Kong, Shenzhen, Director of Shenzhen Research Institute of Big Data and Director of CUHK(SZ)-Tencent AI Lab Joint Laboratory on Machine Intelligence.

== Education ==
Luo was born in November 1963 in Nanchang, China. He received a B.Sc. in Applied Mathematics from Peking University in 1984. He was selected for graduate study in the United States through a joint program of the American Mathematical Society-Society for Industrial and Applied Mathematics (AMS-SIAM) committee and the Chinese Ministry of Education (S.S. Chern Program). After one year at the Nankai Institute of Mathematics, he transferred to MIT, where he obtained a Ph.D. in Operations Research in 1989 under the supervision of John Tsitsiklis.

== Career ==
From 1989 to 2003, Luo immigrated to Canada and was a faculty member in the Department of Electrical and Computer Engineering at McMaster University, Canada, where he later became department head and held a Canada Research Chair (Tier I) in Information Processing.

From 2003 to 2014, he was a professor in the Department of Electrical and Computer Engineering at the University of Minnesota, holding the ADC Chair in Digital Technology.

He currently serves as Vice President (Academic) of The Chinese University of Hong Kong, Shenzhen, as well as Director of the Shenzhen Research Institute of Big Data and Director of the CUHK(SZ)-Tencent AI Lab Joint Laboratory on Machine Intelligence.

== Research ==
Luo's research focuses on mathematical optimization and its applications in signal processing and wireless communications.

== Recognition ==
- Foreign Member of the Chinese Academy of Engineering (CAE) (2021)
- Farkas Prize from the INFORMS Optimization Society (2010)
- Paul Y. Tseng Memorial Lectureship in Continuous Optimization (2018)
- Three Best Paper Awards from the IEEE Signal Processing Society (2004, 2009, 2011)
- Best Paper Award from EURASIP (2011)
- Fellow of the IEEE
- Fellow of SIAM
- Member of the Royal Society of Canada (2014)
- Leading Talent Program of Guangdong Province (2016)

== Editorial and service roles ==
Luo has served as Chair of the IEEE Signal Processing Society Technical Committee on Signal Processing for Communications (SPCOM). He was Editor-in-Chief of IEEE Transactions on Signal Processing (2012–2014) and has been an associate editor for journals including Mathematics of Operations Research, Management Science, and Mathematical Programming.
