= Bruce Jay Nelson =

North american computer scientist

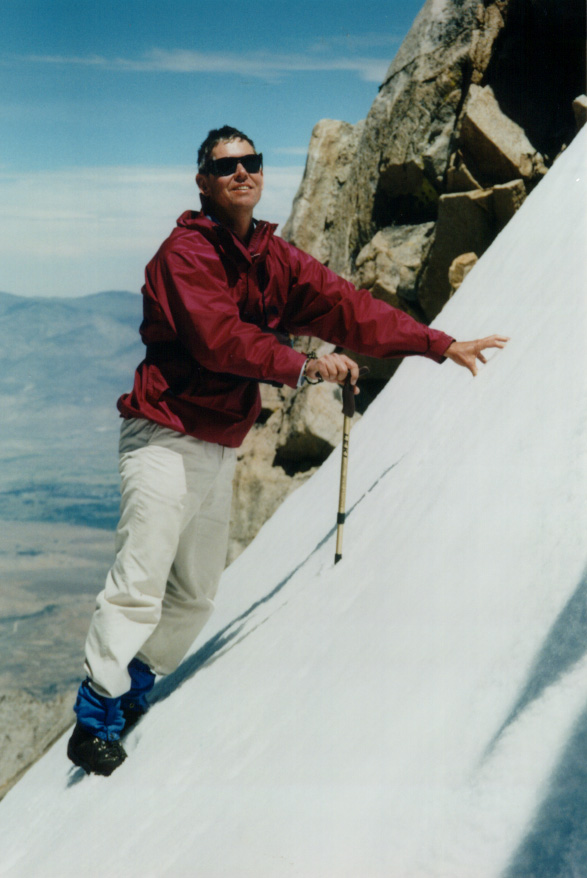
- Known for: remote procedure call

Bruce Jay Nelson (January 19, 1952 – September 19, 1999) was an American computer scientist best known as the inventor of the remote procedure call concept for computer network communications.

Bruce Nelson graduated from Harvey Mudd College in 1974, and went on to earn a master's in computer science from Stanford University in 1976, and a Ph.D. in computer science from Carnegie Mellon University in 1982. While pursuing his Ph.D., he worked at Xerox PARC where he developed the concept of call (RPC). He and his collaborator Andrew Birrell were awarded the 1994 Association for Computing Machinery (ACM) Software System Award for the work on RPC. In 1996 he joined Cisco Systems as Chief Science Officer.

He died on September 19, 1999, due to complications from an aortic dissection, while on a business trip to Tel Aviv, Israel. In 2007 the Birrell and Nelson paper won an operating system hall of fame award from the ACM. Classmates and friends endowed a scholarship in his name at Carnegie Mellon. Harvey Mudd College also named a speaker series in his honor.

== Published papers ==
- Birrell, Andrew D.; Nelson, Bruce Jay (February 1984). "Implementing Remote Procedure Calls" (PDF). ACM Transactions on Computer Systems. 2 (1): 39. doi:10.1145/2080.357392. S2CID 11525846.
