= List of Inferno applications =

This is a list of Inferno programs. Most of these programs are very similar to the Plan 9 applications or UNIX programs with the same name.

== System software ==
=== General user ===
- dd – convert and copy a file
- date – print the date
- echo – print arguments
- emu – Inferno emulator
- mash – programmable shell
- ns – display current namespace
- nsbuild – build Inferno namespace
- os – interface to host OS commands (hosted Inferno only)
- plumb – send message to plumber
- plumber – plumber for interapplication message routing
- rcmd – remote command execution
- runas – run command as another user
- sh – command language
- tiny/sh – reduced command line interface to the Inferno system
- wm/logon – log on to Inferno
- wm/sh, wm/mash – Window frames for the Inferno shells
- wm/wm – window manager

=== System management ===
==== Processes and tasks management ====
- time – time command execution
- kill, broke – terminate processes
- sleep, pause – suspend execution for an interval
- ps – process (thread) status
- wm/task – graphical task manager

==== User management and support ====
- auth/passwd – change user password
- man, wm/man, man2txt, lookman – print or find manual pages

=== Files and text ===
==== Filesystem utilities ====
- chgrp – change file's group or owner
- chmod – change file mode (permissions)
- cp, fcp – copy files
- du – disk usage
- lc – list files in columns
- ls – list files
- mkdir – make a directory
- mv – move files
- bind, mount, unmount – change name space
- pwd – working directory
- rm – remove files
- touch – update the modification time of one or more files

==== Archivers and compression ====
- ar – archive maintainer
- gettar, lstar, puttar – tar archive utilities
- gzip, gunzip – compression and decompression utilities

==== Text processing ====
- cat – concatenate files
- cmp – compare two files
- diff – differential file comparator
- fmt – simple text formatter
- freq – print histogram of character frequencies
- grep – pattern matching
- p – paginate
- read – read from standard input with optional seek
- tail – deliver the last part of a file
- tcs – translate character sets
- tr – translate characters
- wc – count lines, words, and characters

==== Editors ====
- acme, win – interactive text windows, and an editor environment
- wm/brutus – screen editor with support for SGML
- vixen – a vi clone
- wm/edit – simple graphical text editor

=== Communication, networking and remote access ===
- telnet – make a remote telnet connection
- collab/connect – connect to collaborative files and services
- collab/chat, collab/poll, collab/poller, collab/whiteboard – collaborative activities
- cpu – execute a remote command
- wm/dmview, wm/dmwm – view remote displays
- wm/vncv – a VNC remote access tool
- netstat – summarize network connections
- sendmail – send mail messages
- listen, styxlisten, dial – network connections

==== Grid computing ====
- grid/localreg – starts a registry on the local machine
- grid/srv/monitor – graphical display for viewing resource use.
- grid/srv/ns, grid/runns – exports a selected namespace and serves it on stdin.
- grid/query – graphical interface to view resources registered with a known registry
- grid/register – registers a resource with a known registry

=== Security ===
- crypt, auth/aescbc – data encryption
- auth/secstore – retrieve files from secure store
- auth/factotum, auth/feedkey – authentication agent
- idea – encrypt/decrypt a file with the IDEA cipher
- netkey – calculate response to authentication challenge

=== Programming tools ===
- asm, disdump – Assembler, Disassembler
- cprof, wm/cprof – coverage profiling of Limbo programs
- disdep – print load dependencies for Dis file
- wm/deb – graphical Limbo debugger
- limbo – Limbo compiler
- mk – maintain (make) related files
- mprof, wm/mprof – memory profiling Limbo programs
- prof, wm/prof – profiling Limbo programs
- stack – examine call stack
- yacc – yet another compiler-compiler (Limbo version)
- tclsh – a Tcl implementation.
- gitfs – an implementation of the git version control system.

== Application software ==
=== Web browsers ===
- charon – web browser
- webgrab – fetch web page content as files

=== Desktop publishing ===
- cook – SGML converter
- ebook/ebook – Open Ebook browser

=== Graphics and multimedia ===
- auplay, auhdr, raw2iaf, wav2iafew – basic audio output and conversion
- wm/view – picture viewer
- bolgia – an enhanced version of "view" picture viewer

=== Various utilities and games ===
- cal – print calendar
- wm/calendar – print upcoming events
- fortune – sample lines from a file
- wm/memory – memory monitor
- wm/about, wm/clock, wm/coffee, wm/colors, wm/date, wm/man, wm/polyhedra, wm/reversi, wm/rt, wm/stopwatch, wm/sweeper, wm/tetris, wm/unibrowse, wm/vt, wm/winctl – miscellaneous graphical applications
