= Abaco (web browser) =

Discontinued Plan 9 web browser

- Screenshot of Plan 9 homepage viewed in Abaco
- Initial release: [data missing]
- Stable release: Non [±]
- Preview release: Non [±]
- Operating system: Plan 9 from Bell Labs, Linux
- Size: 492 KB
- Type: Web browser
- License: Lucent Public License
- Website: lab-fgb.com/abaco/

Abaco is a discontinued web browser for the Plan 9 operating system. It is a graphical web browser with support for inline images, tables and frames. It has a true multiple document interface inspired by acme's interface. It is a multi-threaded and modest-sized program.

== History ==
webfs, a web file system, and libhtml, a library to parse HTML, were written at Bell Labs as the backend for a new web browser. After the Bell Labs project stalled, Aki Nyrhinen wrote a simple frontend for webfs and libhtml called webpage which can render basic web pages and makes interesting use of the plumber to support hyperlinks. Work on webpage also stalled, and webpage has now been superseded by abaco.

Abaco, written by Federico G. Benavento, supports most of the HTML 4.01 standard, including frames and tables.

== See also ==
- Mothra – Another browser for Plan 9
- List of web browsers
- List of Plan 9 applications
