= List of Plan 9 applications =

This is a list of Plan 9 programs. Many of these programs are very similar to the UNIX programs with the same name, others are to be found only on Plan 9. Others again share only the name, but have a different behaviour.

== System software ==
=== General user ===
- dd – convert and copy a file
- date – date and time
- echo – print arguments
- file – determine file type
- ns – display namespace
- plumb – send message to plumber
- plumber – interprocess messaging
- rc – rc is the Plan 9 shell
- rio – the new Plan 9 windowing system
- 8½ – the old Plan 9 windowing system
- uptime – show how long the system has been running

=== System management ===
==== Processes and tasks management ====
- time – time a command
- kill, slay, broke – print commands to kill processes
- sleep – suspend execution for an interval
- ps – process status
- psu – process status information about processes started by a specific user

==== User management and support ====
- passwd, netkey, iam – change user password
- who – who is using the machine
- man, lookman – print or find pages of this manual

==== File system and server ====
- /boot/boot – connect to the root file server
- fossil/fossil, fossil/flchk, fossil/flfmt, fossil/conf, fossil/last – archival file server
- history – print file names from the dump
- users – file server user list format
- vac – create a vac archive on Venti
- venti/buildindex, venti/checkarenas, venti/checkindex, venti/conf, venti/copy, venti/fmtarenas, venti/fmtindex, venti/fmtisect, venti/rdarena, venti/rdarenablocks, venti/read, venti/wrarenablocks, venti/write – Venti maintenance and debugging commands
- venti/venti, venti/sync – an archival block storage server
- yesterday, diffy – print file names from the dump

==== Hardware devices ====
- setrtc – set real time clock (RTC) on PC hardware

=== Files and text ===
==== Filesystem utilities ====
- chgrp – change file group
- chmod – change mode
- cp, fcp, mv – copy, move files
- du – disk usage
- ls, lc – list contents of directory
- mkdir – make a directory
- bind, mount, umount – change name space
- pwd, pbd – working directory
- rm – remove files
- touch – set modification date of a file

==== Archivers and compression ====
- ar – archive and library maintainer
- gzip, gunzip, bzip2, bunzip2, compress, uncompress, zip, unzip – compress and expand data
- tar – archiver

==== Text processing ====
- awk – pattern-directed scanning and processing language
- cat, read – catenate files
- cmp – compare two files
- diff – differential file comparator
- doc2txt, xls2txt – extract printable strings from Microsoft Office documents
- doctype – intuit command line for formatting a document
- fmt, htmlfmt – simple text formatters
- freq – print histogram of character frequencies
- grep – search a file for a pattern
- idiff – interactive diff
- mc – multicolumn print
- p – paginate
- pr – print file
- sed – stream editor
- spell, sprog – find spelling errors
- split – split a file into pieces
- tail – deliver the last part of a file
- tcs – translate character sets
- tr – translate characters
- wc – word count
- xd – hex, octal, decimal or ASCII dump of file

==== Editors ====
- acme – interactive text editor and shell
- ed – text editor
- sam – screen editor with structural regular expressions

=== Communication, networking and remote access ===
- con, telnet, rx, xms, xmr – remote login, execution, and XMODEM file transfer
- cpu – connection to CPU server
- dial/at, dial/drain, dial/expect, dial/pass – dialer scripting tools
- netstat – summarize network connections
- replica/changes, replica/pull, replica/push, replica/scan – client–server replica management
- ssh, sshnet, scp, aux/sshserve – secure login and file copy from/to Unix or Plan 9
- tel, iwhois – look in phone book
- vncs, vncv – remote frame buffer server and viewer for Virtual Network Computing (VNC)

==== Email and news programs ====
- faces, seemail, vwhois – mailbox interface
- mail – mail and mailboxes
- news – print news items
- upas/filter, upas/list, upas/deliver, upas/token, upas/vf – filtering mail
- upas/fs – mail file server
- upas/marshal – formatting and sending mail
- upas/ml, upas/mlmgr, upas/mlowner – unmoderated mailing lists
- upas/nedmail – reading mail
- upas/scanmail, upas/testscan – spam filters
- upas/send – mail routing and delivery
- upas/smtp, upas/smtpd – mail transport

==== Network system services ====
- ip/dhcpd, ip/dhcpleases, ip/rarpd, ip/tftpd – Internet booting
- aux/listen – listen for calls on a network device
- ndb/query, ndb/mkhash, ndb/mkdb, ndb/cs, ndb/csquery, ndb/dns, ndb/dnsquery, ndb/ipquery, ndb/dnsdebug, ndb/mkhosts – network database
- upas/pop3, ip/imap4d – mail servers
- aux/timesync – NTP client

==== Network utilities ====
- aan – always available network
- ip/ipconfig, ip/rip – Internet configuration and routing
- ip/telnetd, ip/rlogind, ip/rexexec, ip/ftpd – Internet remote access daemons
- ip/ping, ip/gping, ip/traceroute, ip/hogports – probe the Internet
- snoopy – spy on network packets
- ip/udpecho – echo UDP packets

=== Security ===
- auth/aescbc, ipso, auth/secstore – secstore commands
- auth/changeuser, auth/wrkey, auth/convkeys, auth/convkeys2, auth/printnetkey, auth/status, auth/authsrv, auth/guard.srv, auth/login, auth/disable, auth/enable – maintain authentication databases
- auth/factotum, auth/fgui – authentication agent
- auth/secstored, auth/secuser – secstore commands
- delkey – delete keys from factotum

=== Programming tools ===
==== Compilers and programming tools ====
- 0a, 1a, 2a, 5a, 7a, 8a, ka, qa, va – assemblers
- 0c, 1c, 2c, 5c, 7c, 8c, kc, qc, vc – C compilers
- 0l, 1l, 2l, 5l, 7l, 8l, kl, ql, vl – loaders
- acid, truss, trump – debugger
- bc – arbitrary–precision arithmetic language
- cb – C program beautifier
- cpp – C language preprocessor
- ktrace – interpret kernel stack dumps
- leak, kmem – help find memory leaks
- mk, membername – maintain (make) related files
- patch – simple patch creation and tracking system
- pcc – APE C compiler driver
- strip – remove symbols from binary files
- syscall – test a system call
- yacc – yet another compiler-compiler

== Application software ==
=== Web browsers ===
- abaco – a "lame" text-based and graphical web browser
- i – rough web browser, based on charon
- links – a text-based and graphical web browser
- mothra – a very basic web browser
- netsurf - an open-source browser with html, javascript, and css support

=== Desktop publishing ===
- deroff, delatex – remove formatting requests
- eqn – typeset mathematics
- gs – Aladdin Ghostscript (PostScript and PDF language interpreter)
- htmlroff – HTML formatting and typesetting
- lp – printer output
- ms2html, html2ms – convert between troff's ms macros and html
- page – view FAX, image, graphic PostScript PDF, and typesetter output files
- pic, tpic – troff and tex preprocessors for drawing pictures
- pr – print file
- ps2pdf, pdf2ps – convert between PostScript and PDF
- tbl – format tables for nroff or troff
- troff, nroff – text formatting and typesetting
- troff2html – convert troff output into HTML

=== Graphics and multimedia ===
- getmap, colors – display color map
- jpg, gif, png, ppm, bmp, v210, yuv, ico, togif, toppm, topng, toico – view and convert pictures

=== Various utilities and games ===
- astro – print astronomical information
- cal – print calendar
- calendar – print upcoming events
- clock – draws a simple analog clock
- dict – dictionary browser
- fortune – sample lines from a file
- juke, games/jukebox, games/jukefs – music jukebox
- lens – interactive screen magnifier
- map, mapdemo – draw maps on various projections
- games/playlistfs – playlist file system
- thesaurus – search online thesaurus
- scat – sky catalogue
