= Factotum =

Factotum may refer to:

- Factotum (novel), a 1975 novel by Charles Bukowski
- Factotum (film), a 2005 film adaptation of the novel
- A character class in 3.5 edition of Dungeons & Dragons
- Factotum (arts organisation), an arts organisation based in Belfast
- Factotum (software), an authentication system of Plan 9
- "Largo al factotum", an aria from The Barber of Seville by Gioachino Rossini

== See also ==
- List of body men, in U.S. political jargon, personal assistants to politicians or candidates
