= Blit (computer terminal) =

Electronic device

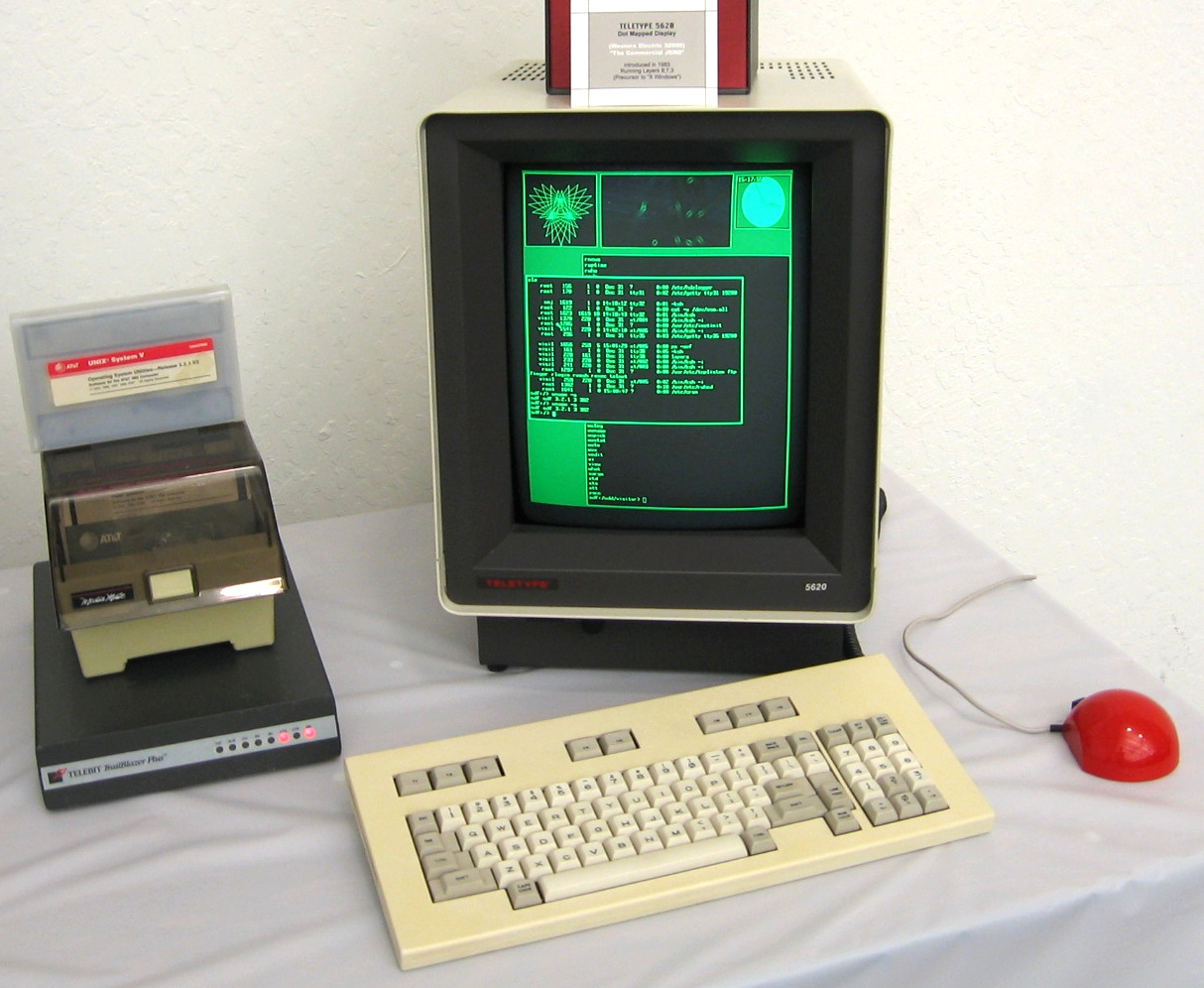
A Teletype DMD 5620 connected to the SDF Public Access Unix System

Blit is a programmable raster graphics computer terminal designed by Rob Pike and Bart N. Locanthi of Bell Labs and released in 1982.

== History ==
The Blit programmable bitmap graphics terminal was designed by Rob Pike and Bart Locanthi Jr. of Bell Labs in 1982. The Blit technology was commercialized by AT&T and Teletype. In 1984, the DMD (dot-mapped display) 5620 was released, followed by models 630 MTG (multi-tasking graphics) in 1987 and 730 MTG in 1989. The 5620 used a Western Electric 32100 processor (a.k.a. Bellmac 32) and had a 15 inches (38.1 cm) green phosphor display with 800×1024×1 resolution (66×88 characters in the initial text mode) interlaced at 30 Hz. The 630 and 730 had Motorola 68000 processors and a 1024×1024×1 monochrome display at 60 Hz (most had amber displays, but some had white or green displays).

The folk etymology for the Blit name is that it stands for Bell Labs Intelligent Terminal, and its creators have also joked that it actually stood for Bacon, Lettuce, and Interactive Tomato. However, Rob Pike's paper on the Blit explains that it was named after the second syllable of bit blit, a common name for the bit-block transfer operation that is fundamental to the terminal's graphics. Its original nickname was Jerq, inspired by a joke used during a demo of a Three Rivers' PERQ graphic workstation and used with permission.

== Functionality ==
When initially switched on, the Blit looked like an ordinary textual "dumb" terminal, although taller than usual. However, after logging into a Unix host (connected to the terminal through a serial port), the host could (via special escape sequences) load software to be executed by the processor of the terminal. This software could make use of the terminal's full graphics capabilities and attached peripherals such as a computer mouse. Normally, users would load the window systems mpx (or its successor mux), which replaced the terminal's user interface by a mouse-driven windowing interface, with multiple terminal windows all multiplexed over the single available serial-line connection to the host.

Each window initially ran a simple terminal emulator, which could be replaced by a downloaded interactive graphical application, for example, a more advanced terminal emulator, an editor, or a clock application. The resulting properties were similar to those of a modern Unix windowing system; however, to avoid having user interaction slowed by the serial connection, the interactive interface and the host application ran on separate systems—an early implementation of distributed computing.

== Window systems ==
Pike wrote two window systems for the Blit, mpx for 8th Edition Unix and mux for 9th Edition, both sporting a minimalistic design. The design of these influenced the later Plan 9 window systems 8½ and rio. When the Blit was commercialized as the DMD 5620, a variant of mpx called "layers" was added to SVR3.

9front (a Plan 9 fork) contains a Blit emulator that runs its original firmware, which can be used with mux (available in recently released Research Unix v8).

== See also ==
- 3B series computers, some of which also used the WECO 32000 processor, were often used with DMD 5620s
- rio
- Thin client
- X terminal
