= Rob Pike =

Computer programmer and co-creator of Go

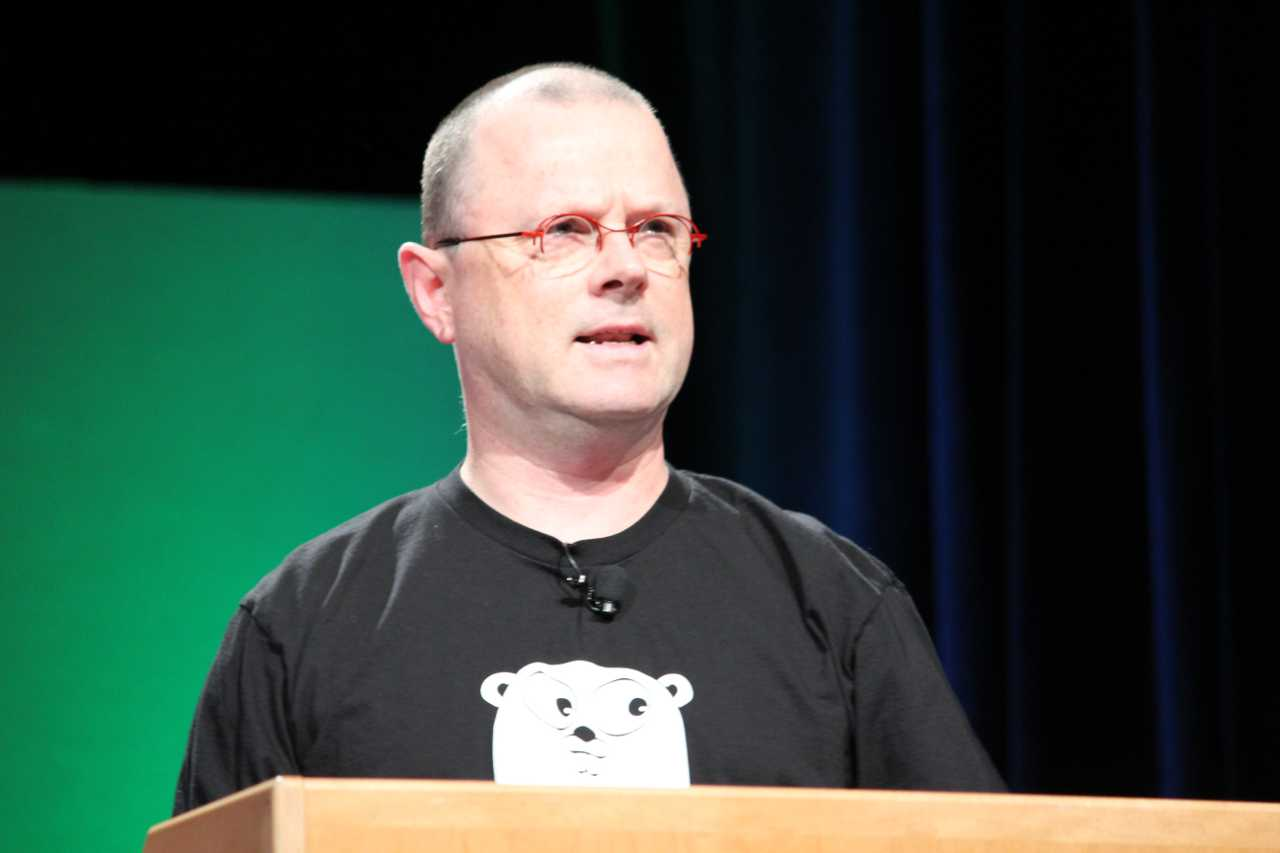
- Rob Pike at OSCON 2010
- Born: 1956 (age 69–70)
- Education: University of Toronto (BS); California Institute of Technology
- Occupation: Software engineer
- Known for: Plan 9, UTF-8, Go
- Spouse: Renée French
- Website: herpolhode.com/rob/

Robert Pike (born 1956) is a Canadian programmer and author. He is best known for his work on the Go programming language while working at Google and the Plan 9 operating system while working at Bell Labs, where he was a member of the Unix team.

Pike wrote the first window system for Unix in 1981. He is the sole inventor named in a US patent for overlapping windows on a computer display.

With Brian Kernighan, he is the co-author of The Practice of Programming and The Unix Programming Environment. With Ken Thompson, he is the co-creator of UTF-8 character encoding.

In 2026, he was awarded the USENIX Lifetime Achievement Award for "the remarkable breadth and lasting impact of his work". The official citation noted that his accomplishments "span operating systems, programming languages, user interfaces, software tools, and the very representation of text itself", and highlighted how they "have influenced both the research community and the practice of computing around the world".

== Additional works ==
While at Bell Labs, Pike was also involved in the creation of the Blit graphical terminal for Unix, the Inferno operating system, and the Limbo programming language. Pike also developed lesser systems such as the Newsqueak concurrent programming language and the vismon program for displaying faces of email authors.

Over the years, Pike has written many text editors; sam and acme are the most well known.

Pike started working at Google in 2002. While there, he was also involved in the creation of the programming language Sawzall.

Pike appeared on Late Night with David Letterman, as a technical assistant to the comedy duo Penn & Teller.

== Personal life ==
Pike is married to author and illustrator Renée French; the couple live both in the US and Australia.

== See also ==
- Mark V. Shaney – an artificial Usenet poster designed by Pike
