= Rc (Unix shell) =

Command line interpreter for Version 10 Unix and Plan 9 from Bell Labs operating systems

rc
- Paradigm: imperative, pipeline
- Designed by: Tom Duff
- Developer: Bell Labs
- First appeared: 1989; 37 years ago
- Typing discipline: weak
- OS: Cross-platform (Version 10 Unix, Plan 9, Plan 9 from User Space)
- Website: doc.cat-v.org/plan_9/4th_edition/papers/rc

Dialects
- Byron's rc

Influenced by
- Bourne shell

Influenced
- es, the Inferno shell

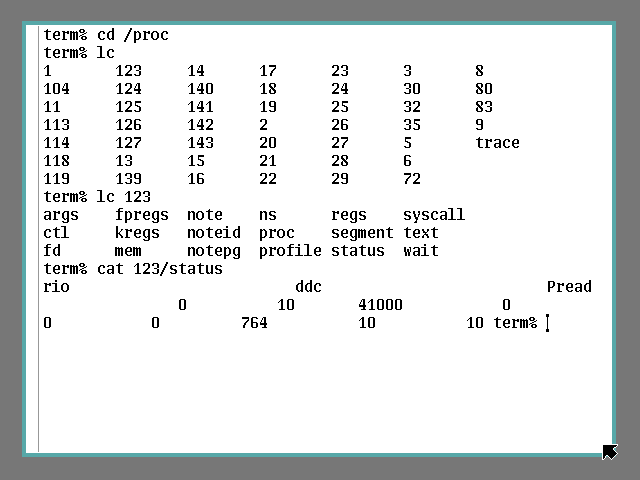
An rc session

rc (for "run commands") is the command-line interpreter for Version 10 Unix and Plan 9 from Bell Labs operating systems. It resembles the Bourne shell, but its syntax is somewhat simpler. It was created by Tom Duff, who is better known for an unusual C programming language construct ("Duff's device").

A port of the original rc to Unix is part of Plan 9 from User Space. A rewrite of rc for Unix-like operating systems by Byron Rakitzis is also available but includes some incompatible changes.

Rc uses C-like control structures instead of the original Bourne shell's ALGOL-like structures, except that it uses an if not construct instead of else in the original implementation but uses else in Byron Rakitzis' implementation, and has a Bourne-like for loop to iterate over lists. In rc, all variables are lists of strings, which eliminates the need for constructs like "$@". Variables are not re-split when expanded. The language is described in Duff's paper.

== Influences ==
=== es ===
es (for "extensible shell") is an open source, command line interpreter developed by Rakitzis and Paul Haahr that uses a scripting language syntax influenced by the rc shell. It was originally based on code from Byron Rakitzis's clone of rc for Unix.

Extensible shell is intended to provide a fully functional programming language as a Unix shell. It does so by introducing "program fragments" in braces as a new datatype, lexical scoping via let, and some more minor improvements. The bulk of es development occurred in the early 1990s, after the shell was introduced at the Winter 1993 USENIX conference in San Diego. Official releases appear to have ceased after 0.9-beta-1 in 1997, and es lacks features present in more popular shells, such as zsh and bash. A public domain fork of es is active as of 2019.

== Examples ==
The Bourne shell script:

if [ hello = "$1"  ]; then
    echo hello, world
else
    case $2 in
    1) echo "$#" 'hey' "jude's$3";;
    2) echo `date` :"$*": :"$@":;;
    *) echo why not 1>&2
    esac
    for i in a b c; do
        echo "$i"
    done
fi

is expressed in rc as:

if(~ $1 hello)
    echo hello, world
if not {
    switch($2) {
    case 1
        echo $#* 'hey' 'jude''s'^$3
    case 2
        echo `{date} :$"*: :$*:
    case *
        echo why not >[1=2]
    }
    for(i in a b c)
        echo $i
}

Rc also supports more dynamic piping:

a |[2] b    # pipe only standard error of a to b — equivalent to '{ a 2>&1 >&3 3>&- | b; } 3>&1' in Bourne shell[1]: Advanced I/O Redirection 
a <{b} <{c} # becomes a {named pipe with standard output of b} {named pipe with standard output of c},
            # better known as "process substitution"[1]: Pipeline Branching
