= Cat (Unix) =

Shell command for writing an input file or stream to standard output

cat
- Original authors: Ken Thompson, Dennis Ritchie
- Developer: AT&T Bell Laboratories
- Release: November 3, 1971; 54 years ago
- Operating system: Unix, Unix-like, Plan 9, Inferno, ReactOS
- Platform: Cross-platform
- Type: Command
- License: coreutils: GPLv3+ ReactOS: GPLv2+

cat is a shell command for writing the content of a file or input stream to standard output. The name is an abbreviation of catenate, a variant form of concatenate. Originally developed for Unix, it is available on many operating systems and shells today.

In addition to combining files, cat is commonly used to copy files and in particular to copy a file to the terminal monitor. Unless redirected, cat outputs file content on-screen.

== History ==
cat was part of the early versions of Unix, e.g., Version 1. It replaced pr, a PDP-7 and Multics command for copying a single file to the screen. It was written by Ken Thompson and Dennis Ritchie. The implementation of cat bundled in GNU coreutils was written by Torbjorn Granlund and Richard Stallman.

== Use ==
The cat command can be used to serve various needs including concatenation and display. A use case for concatenation is to specify multiple input files and to redirect output to another file to persist the result. A common use case for display is to specify a single file without redirecting output so that the file content displays on the monitor.

The Single Unix Specification defines the operation of cat to read files in the sequence given in its arguments, writing their contents to the standard output in the same sequence. The specification mandates the support of one option flag, -u for unbuffered output, meaning that each byte is written after it has been read. Some implementations, like GNU Core Utilities, do this by default and ignore the flag.

If one of the input filenames is specified as a single hyphen (-), then cat reads from standard input at that point in the sequence. If no files are specified, cat reads from standard input only.

The command-syntax is:

cat [options] [path...]

Options include:

- -b (GNU: --number-nonblank), number non-blank output lines
- -e implies -v but also display end-of-line characters as $ (GNU only: -E the same, but without implying -v)
- -n (GNU: --number), number all output lines
- -s (GNU: --squeeze-blank), squeeze multiple adjacent blank lines
- -t implies -v, but also display tabs as ^I (GNU: -T the same, but without implying -v)
- -u use unbuffered I/O for stdout. POSIX does not specify the behavior without this option.
- -v (GNU: --show-nonprinting), displays nonprinting characters, except for tabs and the end of line character

== Use cases ==
cat can be used to pipe a file to a program that expects plain text or binary data on its input stream. cat does not destroy non-text bytes when concatenating and outputting. As such, its two main use cases are text files and certain format-compatible types of binary files.

Concatenation of text is limited to text files using the same legacy encoding, such as ASCII. cat does not provide a way to concatenate Unicode text files that have a Byte Order Mark or files using different text encodings from each other.

For many structured binary data sets, the resulting combined file may not be valid; for example, if a file has a unique header or footer, the result will spuriously duplicate these. However, for some multimedia digital container formats, the resulting file is valid, and so cat provides an effective means of appending files. Video streams can be a significant example of files that cat can concatenate without issue, e.g. the MPEG program stream (MPEG-1 and MPEG-2) and DV (Digital Video) formats, which are fundamentally simple streams of packets.

== Examples ==
Command	Explanation
cat file1.txt	Display contents of file
cat file1.txt file2.txt > combinedfile.txt	Concatenate two text files; stored as a new file
cat > newfile.txt	Create a file called newfile.txt. Type the desired input and press CTRL+D to finish. The text will be in file newfile.txt.
cat file1.txt > file2.txt	Copy the contents of file1.txt into file2.txt
cat file1.txt file2.txt file3.txt | sort > test4	Concatenate the files, sort the complete set of lines, and write the output to a newly created file
cat file1.txt file2.txt | less	Run the program "less" with the concatenation of file1 and file2 as its input
cat file1.txt | grep example	Highlight instances of the word "example" in file1.txt
command | cat	Cancel "command" special behavior (e.g. paging) when it writes directly to TTY (cf. UUOC below)

== Unix culture ==
=== Jargon file definition ===
The Jargon File version 4.4.7 lists this as the definition of cat:

# To spew an entire file to the screen or some other output sink without pause (syn. blast).

1. By extension, to dump large amounts of data at an unprepared target or with no intention of browsing it carefully. Usage: considered silly. Rare outside Unix sites. See also dd, BLT.

Among Unix fans, cat(1) is considered an excellent example of user-interface design, because it delivers the file contents without such verbosity as spacing or headers between the files, and because it does not require the files to consist of lines of text, but works with any sort of data.

Among Unix critics, cat(1) is considered the canonical example of bad user-interface design, because of its woefully unobvious name. It is far more often used to blast a single file to standard output than to concatenate two or more files. The name cat for the former operation is just as unintuitive as, say, LISP's cdr.

=== Useless use of cat ===
Useless use of cat (UUOC) is common Unix jargon for command line constructs that provide only a function of convenience to the user. In computing, the word "abuse", in the sense of "improper or excessive use", is used to disparage the excessive or unnecessary use of a language construct; thus, abuse of cat is sometimes called "cat abuse". Example of a common cat abuse is:

cat filename | command arg1 arg2 argn

This can be rewritten using redirection of stdin instead, in either of the following forms (the first is more traditional):

command arg1 arg2 argn < filename

<filename command arg1 arg2 argn

Beyond other benefits, the input redirection forms allow command to perform random access on the file, whereas the cat examples do not. This is because the redirection form opens the file as the stdin file descriptor which command can fully access, while the cat form simply provides the data as a stream of bytes.

Another common case where cat is unnecessary is where a command defaults to operating on stdin, but will read from a file, if the filename is given as an argument. This is the case for many common commands; the following examples

cat file | grep pattern

cat file | less

can instead be written as

grep pattern file

less file

A common interactive use of cat for a single file is to output the content of a file to standard output. However, if the output is piped or redirected, cat is unnecessary.

A cat written with UUOC might still be preferred for readability reasons, as reading a piped stream left-to-right might be easier to conceptualize. Also, one wrong use of the redirection symbol > instead of < (often adjacent on keyboards) may permanently delete the content of a file, in other words clobbering, and one way to avoid this is to use cat with pipes. Compare:

command < in | command2 > out

<in command | command2 > out

with:

cat in | command | command2 > out

== See also ==
- Less (Unix) – Terminal pager
- netcat – Computer networking utility
- paste – Shell command for joining files horizontally
- split – UNIX text-processing utility program
- TYPE (DOS command)
- zcat – File format and file compression program
