= Tom Duff =

Canadian computer programmer (born 1952)

Thomas Douglas Selkirk Duff
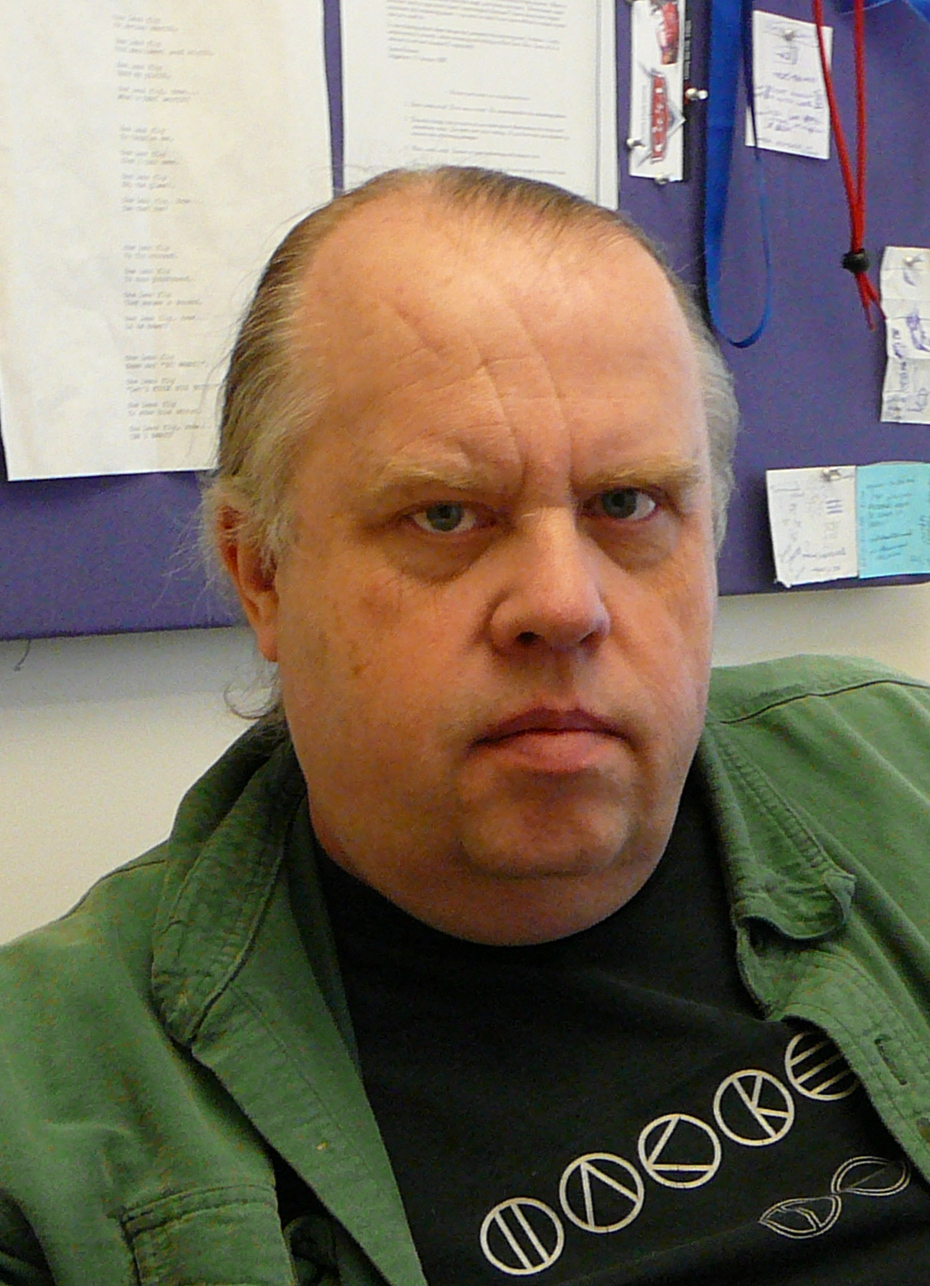
- Tom Duff in his office at Pixar in 2006
- Born: December 8, 1952 (age 73); Toronto
- Occupation: Computer programmer
- Years active: 1974-2021
- Known for: Animation software
- Notable work: Duff's device

Thomas Douglas Selkirk Duff (born December 8, 1952) is a Canadian computer programmer. He worked on Plan 9 at Bell Labs and was the author of the rc shell.

== Life and career ==
=== Early life ===
Duff was born in Toronto, Ontario, Canada, and was named for his putative ancestor, the fifth Earl of Selkirk. He grew up in Toronto and Leaside. In 1974 he graduated from the University of Waterloo with a B.Math and, two years later, was awarded an M.Sc. from the University of Toronto.

=== Programming career ===
Duff worked at the New York Institute of Technology Computer Graphics Lab and the Mark Williams Company in Chicago before moving to Lucasfilm's Computer Research and Development Division. He and Thomas Porter, another Lucasfilm employee, developed a new approach to compositing images; their 1984 paper, "Compositing Digital Images", is "[t]he seminal work on an algebra for image compositing", according to Keith Packard, and "Porter-Duff compositing" is now a key technique in computer graphics. (See, for example, XRender and Glitz.)

Duff later worked for 12 years at Bell Labs Computing Science Research Center, where he worked on computer graphics, wireless networking, and Plan 9; in the course of his work there, he authored the well known "rc" shell for the Version 10 Unix operating system.

Duff worked at Pixar Animation Studios from 1996 until his retirement in 2021.

== Achievements ==
- In November 1983, while working at Lucasfilm, he created Duff's device, a loop unrolling mechanism in C.
- In 1995, he was awarded (with others) the Academy Scientific and Engineering Award for his work on digital image compositing. With Bill Reeves he designed the first version of Pixar's Marionette 3-D animation system, which won the same award in 1997.
- On August 22, 2006, the United States Patent and Trademark Office issued U.S. patent 7,095,409 to Pixar for a "Shot shading method and apparatus" invented by Tom Duff and Robert L. Cook.
- On October 31, 2006, the United States Patent and Trademark Office issued U.S. patent 7,129,940 to Pixar for a "Shot rendering method and apparatus" invented by Tom Duff and Robert L. Cook.
- In 2015 he became the 21st awardee of the J.W. Graham Medal, named in honor of Wes Graham an early influential Professor of Computer Science at the University of Waterloo, and annually awarded to an influential alumnus of the university's Faculty of Mathematics.

== In the media ==
- Tom Duff makes a cameo appearance in the Niven/Pournelle science fiction novel Footfall as a co-discoverer of the invading spaceship: "Chap named Tom Duff, a computer type, spotted it."
- Tom Duff appears briefly in the documentary film "Noisy People" (dir Tim Perkis, 2006) playing the banjo.

== See also ==
- Mothra, a Web browser Tom Duff wrote for Plan 9
- List of people by Erdős number, Duff has an Erdős number of 2
- List of Pixar staff
- List of University of Waterloo people
