= Plan 9 from User Space =

Port of Plan 9 software to Unix-like systems

- Repository: github.com/9fans/plan9port
- Written in: ANSI C
- Operating system: Unix-like
- Website: 9fans.github.io/plan9port/

Plan 9 from User Space (also plan9port or p9p) is a port of many Plan 9 from Bell Labs libraries and applications to Unix-like operating systems. Currently it has been tested on a variety of operating systems, including Linux, macOS, FreeBSD, NetBSD, OpenBSD, Solaris and SunOS. The project's name is a reference to the 1950s Ed Wood film Plan 9 from Outer Space.

A number of key applications have been ported, as have programs used by the system itself, along with the requisite libraries from Plan 9. All of these have been made to work on top of a Unix-like environment instead of their native Plan 9. Some of the most significant ported components are:

- rc – The Plan 9 shell
- sam – A text editor
- acme – A combination of text editor and graphical shell especially useful to programmers
- mk – A tool for building software, analogous to the traditional Unix make utility
- plumber – An interprocess messaging facility
- Venti – A network storage system that permanently stores data blocks
