= Addressable cursor =

In computing, an addressable cursor is a cursor which can, through use of either software or firmware, be moved (at least theoretically) to any given point on the computer screen.
