= Limbo (programming language) =

Programming language

- Paradigm: Concurrent
- Designed by: Sean Dorward, Phil Winterbottom, Rob Pike
- Developer: Historic: Bell Labs, Vita Nuova Holdings; Current: Terzarima Systems, Inferno64 Project
- First appeared: 1995; 31 years ago
- Typing discipline: Strong
- OS: Inferno
- License: MIT License
- Website: github.com/inferno-os/inferno-os/tree/master/doc/limbo

Major implementations
- Dis virtual machine

Influenced by
- C, Pascal, CSP, Alef, Newsqueak

Influenced
- Stackless Python, Go, Rust

Limbo is a programming language for writing distributed systems and is the language used to write applications for the Inferno operating system. It was designed at Bell Labs by Sean Dorward, Phil Winterbottom, and Rob Pike.

The Limbo compiler generates architecture-independent object code which is then interpreted by the Dis virtual machine or compiled just before runtime to improve performance. Therefore all Limbo applications are completely portable across all Inferno platforms.

Limbo's approach to concurrency was inspired by Hoare's communicating sequential processes (CSP), as implemented and amended in Pike's earlier Newsqueak language and Winterbottom's Alef.

== Language features ==
Limbo supports the following features:

- modular programming
- concurrent computing
- strong type checking at compile and run-time
- interprocess communication over typed channels
- automatic garbage collection
- simple abstract data types

== Virtual machine ==
The Dis virtual machine that executes Limbo code is a CISC-like VM, with instructions for arithmetic, control flow, data motion, process creation, synchronizing and communicating between processes, loading modules of code, and support for higher-level data-types: strings, arrays, lists, and communication channels. It uses a hybrid of reference counting and a real-time garbage-collector for cyclic data.

Aspects of the design of Dis were inspired by the AT&T Hobbit microprocessor, as used in the prototype BeBox. A possible production of the formal logical specification for the Dis Virtual machine has been discussed by Charles Forsyth of Terzarima Systems. This is possible due to the regular structure and size of the virtual Machine compared to similar virtual machines.

=== Further developments of the Dis virtual machine ===
The Inferno64 project has extended the Dis virtual machine to 64-bits for application development on 64-bit architectures and platforms. The RiceVM project was started in 2026 that has made a implementation of the Dis virtual machine and Limbo interpreter in Rust which supports Windows 11, macOS, and Linux.

== Examples ==
Limbo uses Ada-style definitions as in:

name := type value;
name0,name1 : type = value;
name2,name3 : type;
name2 = value;

=== Hello world ===
implement Command;

include "sys.m";
    sys: Sys;

include "draw.m";

include "sh.m";

init(nil: ref Draw->Context, nil: list of string)
{
    sys = load Sys Sys->PATH;
    sys->print("Hello World!\n");
}

== Books ==
The 3rd edition of the Inferno operating system and Limbo programming language are described in the textbook Inferno Programming with Limbo ISBN 0-470-84352-7 (Chichester: John Wiley & Sons, 2003), by Phillip Stanley-Marbell.

Another textbook The Inferno Programming Book: An Introduction to Programming for the Inferno Distributed System was started by Martin Atkins, Rob Pike, Howard Trickey and Charles Forsyth but never released.

== See also ==
- The Inferno operating system
- Alef, the predecessor of Limbo
- Plan 9 from Bell Labs, operating system
- Go, similar language from Google
- AT&T Hobbit, a processor architecture which inspired the Dis VM
