= IEEE Internet Computing =

- Discipline: Computer science
- Language: English
- Edited by: Weisong Shi

Publication details
- History: 1997–present
- Publisher: IEEE Computer Society
- Frequency: Bimonthly
- Impact factor: 1.929 (2017)

Standard abbreviations
- ISO 4: IEEE Internet Comput.

Indexing
- CODEN: IICOFX
- ISSN: 1089-7801 (print); 1541-4922 (web)
- LCCN: 97652860

Links
- Journal homepage; Online access

IEEE Internet Computing is a bimonthly peer-reviewed scientific journal published by the IEEE Computer Society. It covers all aspects of emerging and maturing Internet technologies. The editor-in-chief is Weisong Shi (University of Delaware). According to the Journal Citation Reports, the journal has a 2017 impact factor of 1.929.
