= Factotum (software) =

Password management and authentication protocol software

- Developer: Bell Labs
- Written in: C
- Operating system: Plan 9 from Bell Labs
- Platform: Plan 9

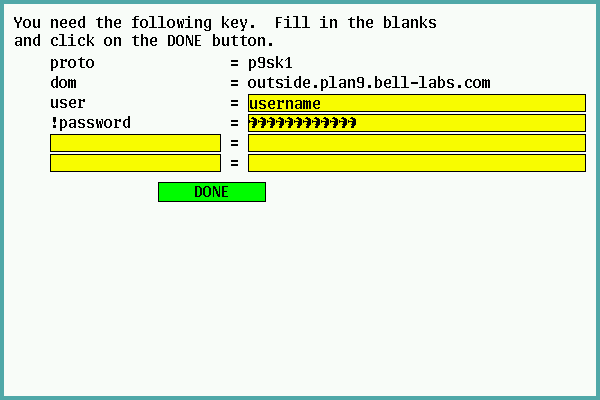
auth/fgui adding a key to factotum

Factotum is a password management and authentication protocol negotiation virtual file system for Plan 9 from Bell Labs. When a program wants to authenticate to a service, it requests a key from Factotum. If Factotum does not have the key, it requests it from the users either via the terminal window or auth/fgui which is then stored in volatile memory. Factotum then authenticates to the service on behalf of the program. For long-term storage, keys are usually stored in secstore or in an encrypted file.

Factotum was introduced in August 2002, at that year's USENIX in Berkeley, California.

== See also ==
- List of password managers
