= Acme (text editor) =

Text editor designed by Rob Pike

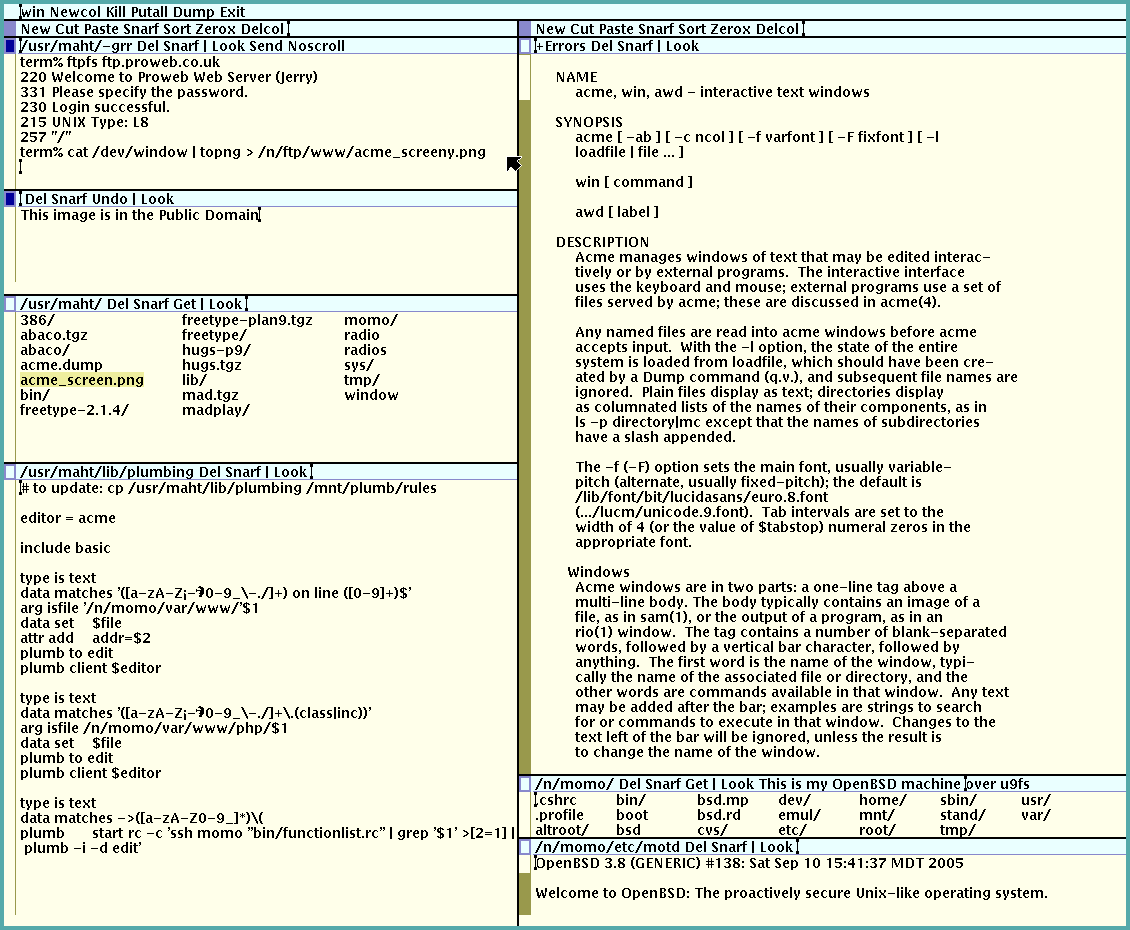
- A screenshot of Acme
- Original author: Rob Pike
- Operating system: Plan 9, Inferno, Unix-like, Windows
- Type: Text editor
- License: MIT; GPL-2.0-only; LPL-1.02
- Website: acme.cat-v.org

Acme is a text editor and graphical shell from the Plan 9 from Bell Labs operating system, designed and implemented by Rob Pike. It can use the Sam command language. The design of the interface was influenced by Oberon. It is different from other editing environments in that it acts as a 9P server. A distinctive element of the user interface is mouse chording.

== Overview ==
Acme can be used as a mail and news reader, or as a frontend to wikifs. These applications are made possible by external components interacting with acme through its file system interface. Rob Pike has mentioned that the name "Acme" was suggested to him by Penn Jillette of Penn & Teller during a movie night at Times Square when he asked for a suitable name for a text editor that does "everything".

== Ports ==
A port to the Inferno operating system is part of Inferno's default distribution. Inferno can run as an application on top of other operating systems, allowing Inferno's port of acme to be used on most operating systems, including Microsoft Windows and Linux. A project called acme: stand alone complex intends to make acme run as a standalone application on the host operating system.

A working port of acme for Unix-like operating systems is included in Plan 9 from User Space, a collection of various ported programs from Plan 9. Currently it has been tested on a variety of operating systems including: Linux, Mac OS X, FreeBSD, NetBSD, OpenBSD, Solaris and SunOS.

== See also ==
- Wily (text editor), a look-alike available for Unix. Unmaintained since the port of the original acme as part of Plan 9 from User Space.
- sam, Rob Pike's other popular text editor. Predecessor of Acme.
- 'Help': A Minimalist Global User Interface. precursor of acme and sharing many of its ideas also by Rob Pike.
- Plan 9 from Bell Labs
- wmii, a window manager with much inspiration from Acme.
- List of Plan 9 applications
