= Plan 9 from Bell Labs =

Research distributed operating system

- Glenda, the Plan 9 mascot in a space suit, drawn by Renée French

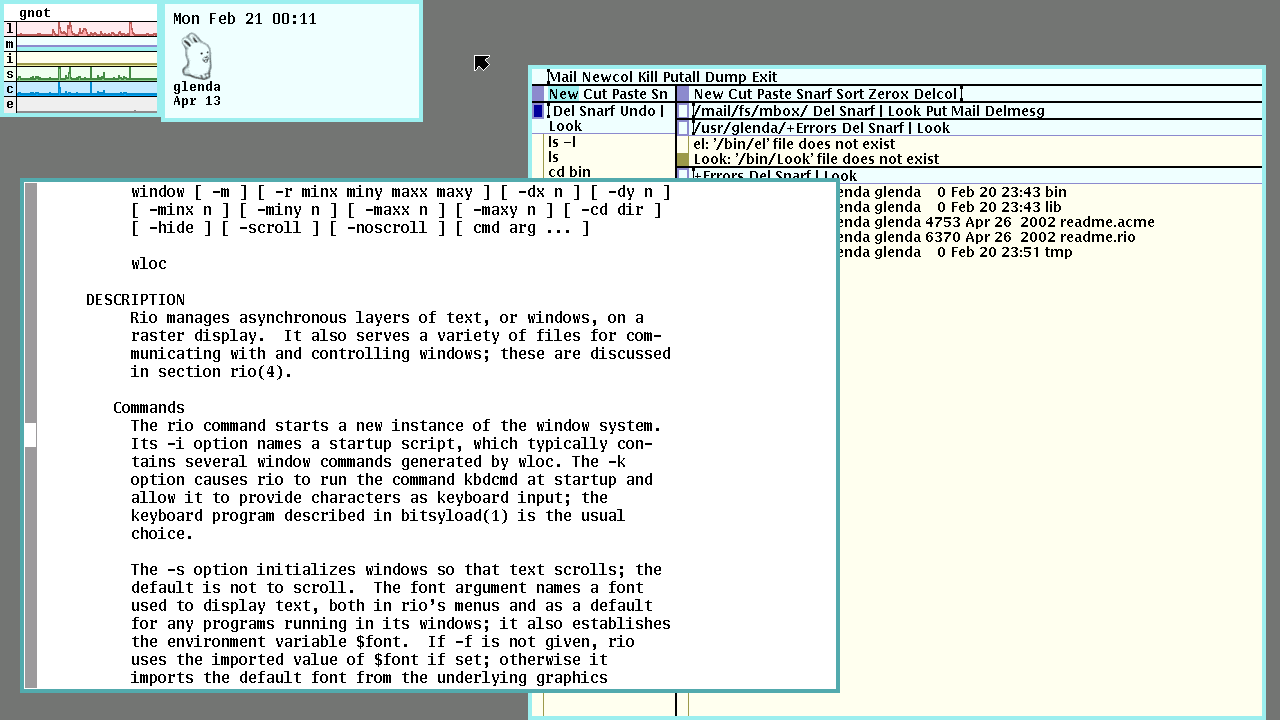
- rio, default user interface of Plan 9 from Bell Labs
- Developer: Plan 9 Foundation, succeeding Bell Labs
- Written in: Dialect of ANSI C
- Working state: Current
- Source model: Open source
- Initial release: 1992; 34 years ago (universities) / 1995; 31 years ago (general public)
- Latest release: Fourth Edition / March 23, 2021; 5 years ago
- Latest preview: 9Legacy / November 10, 2026; 11 days ago
- Repository: 9p.io/sources/plan9/sys
- Marketing target: Operating systems research, networked environments, general-purpose use
- Available in: English
- Supported platforms: x86 / Vx32, x86-64, ARM, RISC-V, MIPS; Historical: DEC Alpha, SPARC, PowerPC
- Kernel type: Monolithic
- Influenced: Inferno
- Influenced by: Research Unix, Cambridge Distributed Computing System
- Default user interface: rio / rc
- License: 2021: MIT; 2014: GPL-2.0-only; 2002: LPL-1.02; 2000: Plan 9 OSL
- Succeeded by: 9Legacy (Official); Derivatives and forks (Unofficial)
- Official website: p9f.org

Plan 9 from Bell Labs is an operating system designed by the Computing Science Research Center (CSRC) at Bell Labs in the mid-1980s, built on the UNIX concepts first developed there in the late 1960s. Since 2000, Plan 9 has been free and open-source. The final official release was in early 2021 as the Plan 9 Foundation now recommends the use of 9legacy.

Under Plan 9, UNIX's everything is a file metaphor is extended via a pervasive network-centric (distributed) filesystem, and the cursor-addressed, terminal-based I/O at the heart of UNIX is replaced by a windowing system and graphical user interface without cursor addressing (although rc, the Plan 9 shell, is text-based). Plan 9 also introduced capability-based security and a log-structured file system called Fossil that provides snapshotting and versioned file histories.

The name Plan 9 from Bell Labs is a reference to the Ed Wood 1957 cult science fiction Z-movie Plan 9 from Outer Space. The system continues to be used and developed by operating system researchers and hobbyists.

== History ==
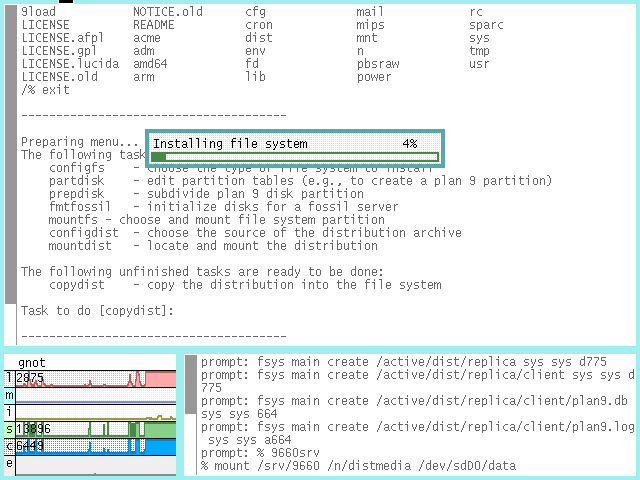
Screenshot of Plan 9 installation

Plan 9 from Bell Labs was originally developed, starting in the late 1980s, by members of the Computing Science Research Center at Bell Labs, the same group that originally developed Unix and the C programming language. The Plan 9 team was initially led by Rob Pike, Ken Thompson, Dave Presotto and Phil Winterbottom, with support from Dennis Ritchie as head of the Computing Techniques Research Department. Over the years, many notable developers have contributed to the project, including Brian Kernighan, Tom Duff, Doug McIlroy, Bjarne Stroustrup and Bruce Ellis.

Plan 9 replaced Unix as Bell Labs's primary platform for operating systems research. It explored several changes to the original Unix model that facilitate the use and programming of the system, notably in distributed multi-user environments. After several years of development and internal use, Bell Labs shipped the operating system to universities in 1992. Three years later, Plan 9 was made available for commercial parties by AT&T via the book publisher Harcourt Brace. With source licenses costing $350, AT&T targeted the embedded systems market rather than the computer market at large. Ritchie commented that the developers did not expect to do "much displacement" given how established other operating systems had become.

By early 1996, the Plan 9 project had been "put on the back burner" by AT&T in favor of Inferno, intended to be a rival to Sun Microsystems' Java platform. In the late 1990s, Bell Labs' new owner Lucent Technologies dropped commercial support for the project and in 2000, a third release was distributed under an open-source license. A fourth release under a new free software license occurred in 2002. In early 2015, the final Bell Labs release of Plan 9 occurred.

A user and development community, including current and former Bell Labs personnel, produced minor daily releases in the form of ISO images. Bell Labs hosted the development. The now archived development source tree is accessible over the 9P and HTTP protocols and was used to update existing installations. In addition to the official components of the OS included in the ISOs, Bell Labs did host a repository of externally developed applications and tools.

As Bell Labs has moved on to later projects in recent years, development of the official Plan 9 system had stopped. On March 23, 2021, development resumed following the transfer of copyright from Bell Labs to the Plan 9 Foundation. Geoff Collyer, a Plan 9 maintainer, published his Plan 9 work on his personal homepage, which include the 64-bit 9k kernel and a RISC-V port. Official development of Plan 9 in 2026 by the Plan 9 Foundation, continues through the 9legacy project.

Unofficial development for the system also continues on the 9front fork, where active contributors provide monthly builds and new functionality. So far, the 9front fork has provided the system Wi-Fi drivers, audio drivers, USB support and built-in game emulator, along with other features. Other recent Plan 9-inspired operating systems include Harvey OS and Jehanne OS.

Date	Release	Comment
1992	Plan 9 1st edition	Released by Bell Labs to universities
1995	Plan 9 2nd edition	Released by Bell Labs for non-commercial purposes
2000	Plan 9 3rd ed. (Brazil)	Released by Lucent Technologies under an open source license
2002	Plan 9 4th edition	Released by Lucent Technologies under a new free software license

== Design concepts ==
Plan 9 from Bell Labs is like the Quakers: distinguished by its stress on the 'Inner Light,' noted for simplicity of life, in particular for plainness of speech. Like the Quakers, Plan 9 does not proselytize.

— Sape J. Mullender, Pierre G. Jansen.
Real Time in a Real Operating System

Plan 9 is a distributed operating system, designed to make a network of heterogeneous and geographically separated computers function as a single system. In a typical Plan 9 installation, users work at terminals running the window system rio, and they access CPU servers which handle computation-intensive processes. Permanent data storage is provided by additional network hosts acting as file servers and archival storage.

Its designers state that,

[t]he foundations of the system are built on two ideas: a per-process name space and a simple message-oriented file system protocol.

— Pike et al.

The first idea (a per-process name space) means that, unlike on most operating systems, processes (running programs) each have their own view of the namespace, corresponding to what other operating systems call the file system; a single path name may refer to different resources for different processes. The potential complexity of this setup is controlled by a set of conventional locations for common resources.

The second idea (a message-oriented filesystem) means that processes can offer their services to other processes by providing virtual files that appear in the other processes' namespace. The client process's input/output on such a file becomes inter-process communication between the two processes. This way, Plan 9 generalizes the Unix notion of the filesystem as the central point of access to computing resources. It carries over Unix's idea of device files to provide access to peripheral devices (mice, removable media, etc.) and the possibility to mount filesystems residing on physically distinct filesystems into a hierarchical namespace, but adds the possibility to mount a connection to a server program that speaks a standardized protocol and treat its services as part of the namespace.

For example, the original window system, called 8½, exploited these possibilities as follows. Plan 9 represents the user interface on a terminal by means of three pseudo-files: mouse, which can be read by a program to get notification of mouse movements and button clicks; cons, which can be used to perform textual input/output; and bitblt, writing to which enacts graphics operations (see bit blit). The window system multiplexes these devices: when creating a new window to run some program in, it first sets up a new namespace in which mouse, cons and bitblt are connected to itself, hiding the actual device files to which it itself has access. The window system thus receives all input and output commands from the program and handles these appropriately, by sending output to the actual screen device and giving the currently focused program the keyboard and mouse input. The program does not need to know if it is communicating directly with the operating system's device drivers, or with the window system; it only has to assume that its namespace is set up so that these special files provide the kind of input and accept the kind of messages that it expects.

Plan 9's distributed operation relies on the per-process namespaces as well, allowing client and server processes to communicate across machines in the way just outlined. For example, the cpu command starts a remote session on a computation server. The command exports part of its local namespace, including the user's terminal's devices (mouse, cons, bitblt), to the server, so that remote programs can perform input/output using the terminal's mouse, keyboard and display, combining the effects of remote login and a shared network filesystem.

=== 9P protocol ===
All programs that wish to provide services-as-files to other programs speak a unified protocol, called 9P. Compared to other systems, this reduces the number of custom programming interfaces. 9P is a generic, medium-agnostic, byte-oriented protocol that provides for messages delivered between a server and a client. The protocol is used to refer to and communicate with processes, programs, and data, including both the user interface and the network. With the release of the 4th edition, it was modified and renamed 9P2000.

Unlike most other operating systems, Plan 9 does not provide special application programming interfaces (such as Berkeley sockets, X resources or ioctl system calls) to access devices. Instead, Plan 9 device drivers implement their control interface as a file system, so that the hardware can be accessed by the ordinary file input/output operations read and write. Consequently, sharing the device across the network can be accomplished by mounting the corresponding directory tree to the target machine.

=== Union directories and namespaces ===
Plan 9 allows the user to collect the files (called names) from different directory trees in a single location. The resulting union directory behaves as the concatenation of the underlying directories (the order of concatenation can be controlled); if the constituent directories contain files having the same name, a listing of the union directory (ls or lc) will simply report duplicate names. Resolution of a single path name is performed top-down: if the directories top and bottom are unioned into u with top first, then u/name denotes top/name if it exists, bottom/name only if it exists and top/name does not exist, and no file if neither exists. No recursive unioning of subdirectories is performed, so if top/subdir exists, the files in bottom/subdir are not accessible through the union.

A union directory can be created by using a sequence of bind commands:

bind /arm/bin /bin
bind -a /acme/bin/arm /bin
bind -b /usr/alice/bin /bin

In the example above, /arm/bin is mounted at /bin, the contents of /arm/bin replacing the previous contents of /bin. Acme's bin directory is then union mounted after /bin, and Alice's personal bin directory is union mounted before. When a file is requested from /bin, it is first looked for in /usr/alice/bin, then in /arm/bin, and then finally in /acme/bin/arm.

The separate process namespaces thus usually replace the notion of a search path in the shell. A path environment variable ($path) still exists in the rc shell (the shell mainly used in Plan 9); however, rc's path environment variable conventionally only contains the /bin and . directories and modifying the variable is discouraged, instead, adding additional commands should be done by binding several directories together as a single /bin. Unlike in Plan 9, the path environment variable of Unix shells should be set to include the additional directories whose executable files need to be added as commands.

Furthermore, the kernel can keep separate mount tables for each process, and can thus provide each process with its own file system namespace. Processes' namespaces can be constructed independently, and the user may work simultaneously with programs that have heterogeneous namespaces. Namespaces may be used to create an isolated environment similar to chroot, but in a more secure way.

Plan 9's union directory architecture inspired 4.4BSD and Linux union file system implementations, although the developers of the BSD union mounting facility found the non-recursive merging of directories in Plan 9 "too restrictive for general purpose use".

=== Special virtual filesystem ===
==== /proc ====
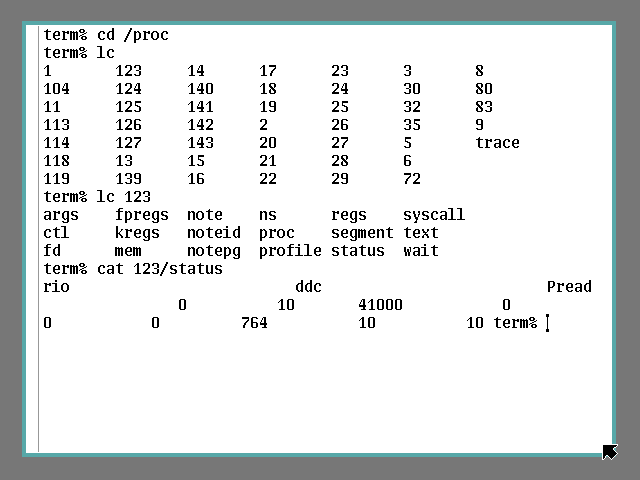
Listing processes with list contents of directory (ls, lc) command in /proc

Instead of having system calls specifically for process management, Plan 9 provides the /proc file system. Each process appears as a directory containing information and control files which can be manipulated by the ordinary file IO system calls.

The file system approach allows Plan 9 processes to be managed with simple file management tools such as ls and cat; however, the processes cannot be copied and moved as files.

==== /net ====
Plan 9 does not have specialised system calls or ioctls for accessing the networking stack or networking hardware. Instead, the /net file system is used. Network connections are controlled by reading and writing control messages to control files. Sub-directories such as /net/tcp and /net/udp are used as an interface to their respective protocols.

=== Unicode ===
To reduce the complexity of managing character encodings, Plan 9 uses Unicode throughout the system. The initial Unicode implementation was ISO/IEC 10646-1:1993. Ken Thompson invented UTF-8, which became the native encoding in Plan 9. The entire system was converted to general use in 1992. UTF-8 preserves backwards compatibility with traditional null-terminated strings, enabling more reliable information processing and the chaining of multilingual string data with Unix pipes between multiple processes. Using a single UTF-8 encoding with characters for all cultures and regions eliminates the need for switching between code sets.

=== Combining the design concepts ===
Though interesting on their own, the design concepts of Plan 9 were supposed to be most useful when combined. For example, to implement a network address translation (NAT) server, a union directory can be created, overlaying the router's /net directory tree with its own /net. Similarly, a virtual private network (VPN) can be implemented by overlaying in a union directory a /net hierarchy from a remote gateway, using secured 9P over the public Internet. A union directory with the /net hierarchy and filters can be used to sandbox an untrusted application or to implement a firewall. In the same manner, a distributed computing network can be composed with a union directory of /proc hierarchies from remote hosts, which allows interacting with them as if they are local.

When used together, these features allow for assembling a complex distributed computing environment by reusing the existing hierarchical name system.

== Software for Plan 9 ==
As a benefit from the system's design, most tasks in Plan 9 can be accomplished by using ls, cat, grep, cp and rm utilities in combination with the rc shell (the default Plan 9 shell).

Factotum is an authentication and key management server for Plan 9. It handles authentication on behalf of other programs such that both secret keys and implementation details need only be known to Factotum.

=== Graphical programs ===
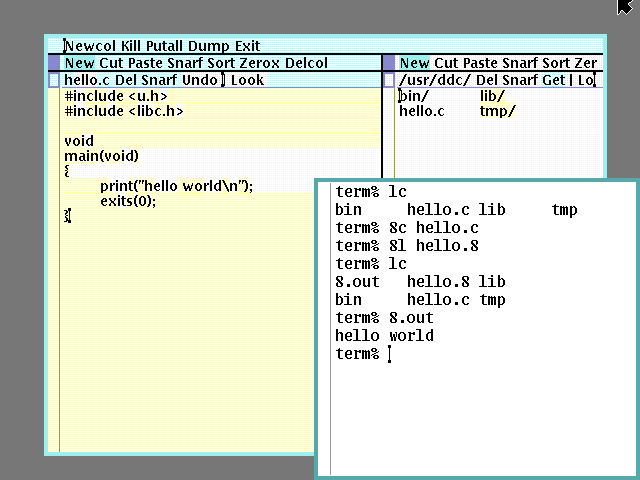
Plan 9 running acme and rc

Unlike Unix, Plan 9 was designed with graphics in mind. After booting, a Plan 9 terminal will run the rio windowing system, in which the user can create new windows displaying rc. Graphical programs invoked from this shell replace it in its window.

The plumber provides an inter-process communication mechanism which allows system-wide hyperlinking.

Sam and acme are Plan 9's text editors.

=== Storage system ===
Plan 9 supports the Kfs, Paq, Cwfs, FAT, and Fossil file systems. The last was designed at Bell Labs specifically for Plan 9 and provides snapshot storage capability. It can be used directly with a hard drive or backed with Venti, an archival file system and permanent data storage system.

Ori Bernstein of the Plan 9 Foundation has proposed a new filesystem called GEFS that is a blend of features from Cwfs and Fossil, inspired by HAMMER as an updated everyday use replacement for Fossil. GEFS has additionally been ported to OpenBSD.

=== Software development ===
The distribution package for Plan 9 includes special compiler variants and programming languages, and provides a tailored set of libraries along with a windowing user interface system specific to Plan 9. The bulk of the system is written in a dialect of C (ANSI C with some extensions and some other features left out). The compilers for this language were custom built with portability in mind; according to their author, they "compile quickly, load slowly, and produce medium quality object code".

A concurrent programming language called Alef was available in the first two editions, but was then dropped for maintenance reasons and replaced by a threading library for C. The Go programming language is also available for the latest Plan 9 variants.

=== Unix compatibility ===
Though Plan 9 was supposed to be a further development of Unix concepts, compatibility with preexisting Unix software was never the goal for the project. Many command-line utilities of Plan 9 share the names of Unix counterparts, but work differently.

Plan 9 can support POSIX applications and can emulate the Berkeley socket interface through the ANSI/POSIX Environment (APE) that implements an interface close to ANSI C and POSIX, with some common extensions (the native Plan 9 C interfaces conform to neither standard). It also includes a POSIX-compatible shell. APE's authors claim to have used it to port the X Window System (X11) to Plan 9, although they did not ship X11 "because supporting it properly is too big a job". As of 2026, APE has since been extended through the APExp project which has added utilities from the GNU project along with library code from Musl and OpenBSD, allowing code previously written in C11 to be reused on Plan 9. Linux binaries can be used with the help of a "linuxemu" (Linux emulator) application; however, it is still a work in progress. Vice versa, the Vx32 virtual machine allows a slightly modified Plan 9 kernel to run as a user process in Linux, supporting unmodified Plan 9 programs.

== Reception ==
=== Comparison to contemporary operating systems ===
In 1991, Plan 9's designers compared their system to other early nineties operating systems in terms of size, showing that the source code for a minimal ("working, albeit not very useful") version was less than one-fifth the size of a Mach microkernel without any device drivers (5899 or 4622 lines of code for Plan 9, depending on metric, vs. 25530 lines). The complete kernel comprised 18000 lines of code. (According to a 2006 count, the kernel was then some 150,000 lines, but this was compared against more than 4.8 million in Linux.)

Within the operating systems research community, as well as the commercial Unix world, other attempts at achieving distributed computing and remote filesystem access were made concurrently with the Plan 9 design effort. These included the Network File System and the associated vnode architecture developed at Sun Microsystems, and more radical departures from the Unix model such as the Sprite OS from UC Berkeley. Sprite developer Brent Welch points out that the SunOS vnode architecture is limited compared to Plan 9's capabilities in that it does not support remote device access and remote inter-process communication cleanly, even though it could have, had the preexisting UNIX domain sockets (which "can essentially be used to name user-level servers") been integrated with the vnode architecture.

One critique of the "everything is a file", communication-by-textual-message design of Plan 9 pointed out limitations of this paradigm compared to the typed interfaces of Sun's object-oriented operating system, Spring:

Plan 9 constrains everything to look like a file. In most cases the real interface type comprises the protocol of messages that must be written to, and read from, a file descriptor. This is difficult to specify and document, and prohibits any automatic type checking at all, except for file errors at run time. (...) [A] path name relative to a process' implicit root context is the only way to name a service. Binding a name to an object can only be done by giving an existing name for the object, in the same context as the new name. As such, interface references simply cannot be passed between processes, much less across networks. Instead, communication has to rely on conventions, which are prone to error and do not scale.

— Roscoe; emphasis in the original.

A later retrospective comparison of Plan 9, Sprite and a third contemporary distributed research operating system, Amoeba, found that

the environments they [Amoeba and Sprite] build are tightly coupled within the OS, making communication with external services difficult. Such systems suffer from the radical departure from the UNIX model, which also discourages portability of already existing software to the platform (...). The lack of developers, the very small range of supported hardware and the small, even compared to Plan 9, user base have also significantly slowed the adoption of those systems (...). In retrospect, Plan 9 was the only research distributed OS from that time which managed to attract developers and be used in commercial projects long enough to warrant its survival to this day.

— Mirtchovski, Simmonds and Minnich

=== Impact ===
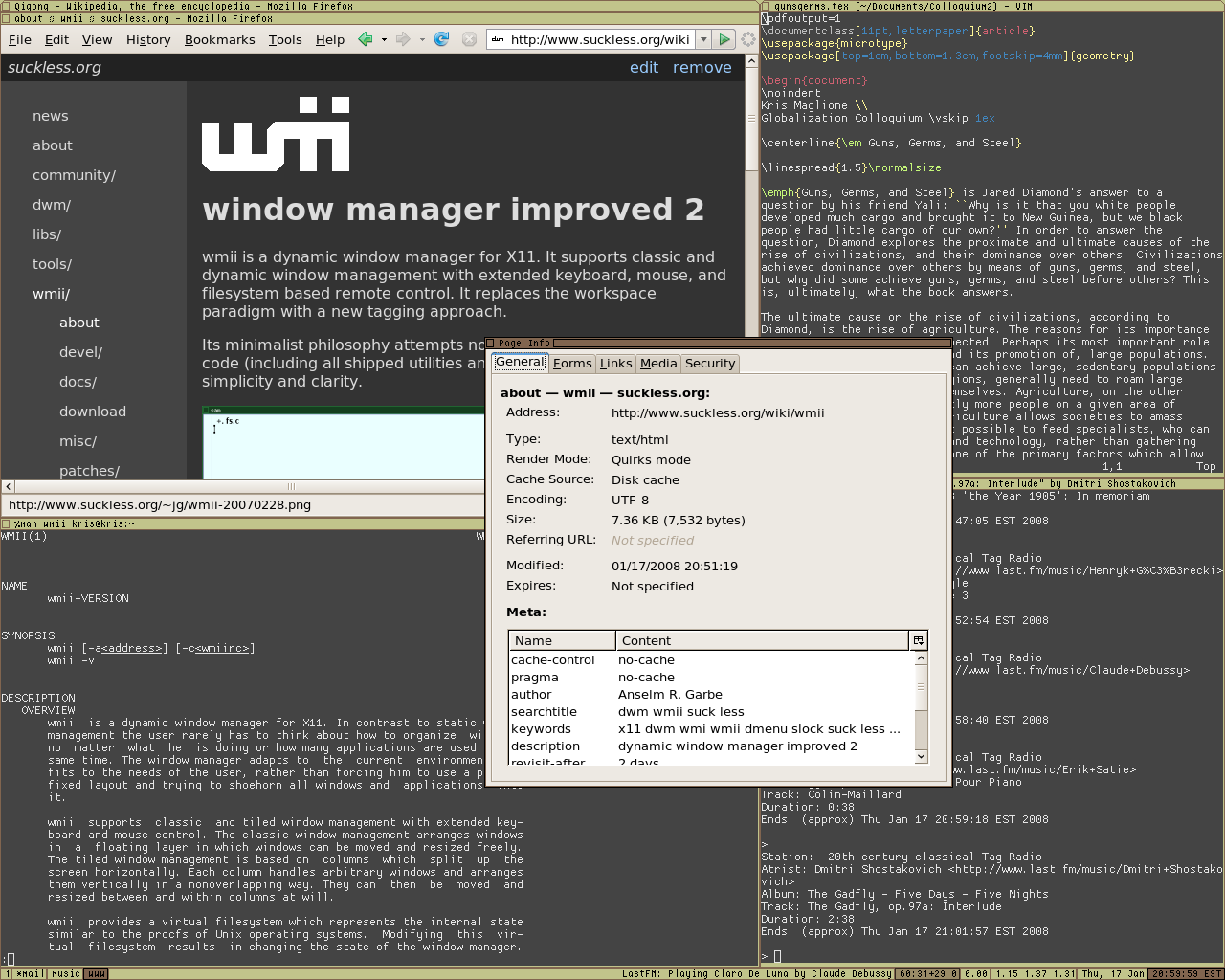
The wmii X window manager was inspired by acme, a text editor from the Plan 9 project.

Plan 9 demonstrated that an integral concept of Unix—that every system interface could be represented as a set of files—could be successfully implemented in a modern distributed system. Some features from Plan 9, like the UTF-8 character encoding of Unicode, have been implemented in other operating systems. Unix-like operating systems such as Linux have implemented 9P2000, Plan 9's protocol for accessing remote files, and have adopted features of rfork, Plan 9's process creation mechanism. Additionally, in Plan 9 from User Space, several of Plan 9's applications and tools, including acme and its predecessor sam, have been ported to Unix and Linux systems and have achieved some level of popularity. Several projects seek to replace the GNU operating system programs surrounding the Linux kernel with the Plan 9 operating system programs. The 9wm window manager was inspired by 8½, the older windowing system of Plan 9; wmii is also heavily influenced by Plan 9. In computer science research, Plan 9 has been used as a grid computing platform and as a vehicle for research into ubiquitous computing without middleware. In commerce, Plan 9 underlies Coraid storage systems. However, Plan 9 has never approached Unix in popularity, and has been primarily a research tool:

[I]t looks like Plan 9 failed simply because it fell short of being a compelling enough improvement on Unix to displace its ancestor. Compared to Plan 9, Unix creaks and clanks and has obvious rust spots, but it gets the job done well enough to hold its position. There is a lesson here for ambitious system architects: the most dangerous enemy of a better solution is an existing codebase that is just good enough.

— Eric S. Raymond

Other factors that contributed to low adoption of Plan 9 include the lack of commercial backup, the low number of end-user applications, and the lack of device drivers.

Inferno, through its hosted capabilities, has been a vehicle for bringing Plan 9 technologies to other systems as a hosted part of heterogeneous computing grids.

Several projects work to extend Plan 9, including 9atom and 9front. These forks augment Plan 9 with additional hardware drivers and software, including an improved version of the Upas e-mail system, the Go compiler, Mercurial version control system support (and now also a git implementation), and other programs. Plan 9 was ported to the Raspberry Pi single-board computer. The discontinued Harvey project attempted to replace the custom Plan 9 C compiler with GCC, to leverage modern development tools such as GitHub and Coverity, and speed up development.

Since Windows 10 version 1903, the Windows Subsystem for Linux implements the Plan 9 Filesystem Protocol as a server and the host Windows operating system acts as a client.

== Descendants of Plan 9 from Bell Labs ==
=== Inferno ===
Inferno is a Bell Labs developed descendant of Plan 9, and shares many design concepts and even source code in the kernel, particularly around devices and the Styx/9P2000 protocol. Inferno shares with Plan 9 the Unix heritage from Bell Labs and the Unix philosophy; portions of the Inferno kernel contains code originally developed for the internal Brazil effort which later became Plan 9 3rd edition. Many of the command line tools in Inferno were Plan 9 tools that were translated to Limbo. Inferno was intended to be a broader commercialization of the newer concepts introduced with Plan 9. Vita Nuova Holdings has held the rights to Inferno since 2000. Inferno is compiled with a modified version of the Plan 9 compiler suite; this modified suite is now the basis for a updated version of the Plan 9 compiler suite. Inferno is currently maintained by Charles Forsyth who now sits on the board of the Plan 9 Foundation as a director.

=== 9Legacy ===
9legacy is a continuation of Plan 9 from Bell Labs. It first appeared in 2011 as a set of patches to extend the Bell Labs Plan 9 distribution and create an alternative distribution. It is now promoted by the Plan 9 Foundation as the de facto successor to the original Bell Labs Plan 9 distribution. The 9legacy distribution is primarily maintained by David du Colombier who is also a board director of the Plan 9 Foundation.

=== Derivatives and forks ===
- 9front is a fork of Plan 9. It was started to remedy a perceived lack of devoted development resources inside Bell Labs, and has accumulated various fixes and improvements; It is also noted for its many breaking differences between 9legacy. Two of its main contributors are involved with the Plan 9 Foundation board; Ron Minnich is the president of the Plan 9 Foundation while Ori Bernstein sits on the board as a director.
- NIX is a fork of Plan9 aimed at multicore systems and cloud computing.
- Principia Softwarica is a fork intended to repurpose Plan 9 towards use in teaching operating system theory.
- Plan B designed to work in distributed environments where the set of available resources is different at different points in time. Originally based on the third edition Plan 9 kernel, Plan B was moved into user space to run on current Plan 9 systems.
- R9 is a reimplementation of the Plan 9 kernel on Rust (although there is no port of the Rust programming language compiler to Plan 9).

==== Discontinued derivatives and forks ====
- 9atom augmented the Plan 9 distribution with the addition of a 386 PAE kernel, an amd64 cpu and terminal kernel, nupas, extra pc hardware support, IL and Ken's fs. Its home page hasn't been updated since 2013, and very little is known about its development or community.
- Akaros was designed for many-core architectures and large-scale SMP systems.
- Harvey OS was an effort to get the Plan 9 code working with gcc and clang.
- JehanneOS was an experimental OS derived from Plan 9. Its userland and modules are mostly derived from 9front, its build system from Harvey OS, and its kernel is a fork of the 9k 64-bit Plan9 kernel. It is no longer available.
- node9 was a scripted derivative of Plan9/Inferno that replaces the Limbo programming language and DIS virtual machine with the Lua language and LuaJit virtual machine. It also replaces the Inferno per-platform hosted I/O with Node.js' libuv eventing and I/O for consistent, cross-platform hosting. It's a proof-of-concept that demonstrates that a distributed OS can be constructed from per-process namespaces and generic cloud elements to construct a single-system-image of arbitrary size.

=== Potential successor to Plan 9 from Bell Labs 4th Edition ===
Plan 9 Foundation board director Charles Forsyth has proposed scrapping 9legacy and merging parts of 9legacy into 9front as a means of completing the next official release of Plan 9 from Bell Labs, thus achieving the stated aim of the Plan 9 Foundation to have a unified release which would succeed Plan 9 from Bell Labs 4th Edition.

== Plan 9 Foundation ==
When Plan 9 was first released to universities in 1992 and the wider public in 1995, outside involvement was almost exclusively co-ordinated over the 9fans mailing list in collaboration with Bell Labs researchers. In 2005, the Bell Labs Computing Sciences Research Center was shut down by Lucent Technologies leading to a need for other ways to foster outside involvement; The following year would see the creation of the first International Workshop on Plan 9 which was held over the days of December 4-5 2006. Plan 9 development would continue at Bell labs in conjunction with the mailing list and the International Workshop of Plan 9 would continue until the 8th edition held in 2013.

In 2020, The Plan 9 Foundation was founded by former researchers who had worked at Bell Labs to take over the Plan 9 development, trademarks, copyrights, mailing lists, and events from Bell Labs and ensure that future development and events would be sustainably managed with further outside involvement. The transfer was completed in 2021 and the Plan 9 Foundation would restore the International Workshop on Plan 9 where the 9th edition was held at the University of Waterloo, Ontario in 2023.

The Plan 9 Foundation continues its founding mission and will be holding the 13th edition of the International Workshop on Plan 9 on 13-16 May 2027 at the Czech Technical University, Prague. The Plan 9 Foundation additionally makes available, the minutes of its latest board meetings on the 9fans mailing list.

== License ==
Starting with the release of Fourth edition in April 2002, the full source code of Plan 9 from Bell Labs is freely available under Lucent Public License 1.02, which is considered to be an open-source license by the Open Source Initiative (OSI), free software license by the Free Software Foundation, and it passes the Debian Free Software Guidelines.

In February 2014, the University of California, Berkeley, was authorized by the current Plan 9 copyright holder – Alcatel-Lucent – to release all Plan 9 software previously governed by the Lucent Public License, Version 1.02 under the GPL-2.0-only.

On March 23, 2021, ownership of Plan 9 transferred from Bell Labs to the Plan 9 Foundation, and all previous releases have been relicensed to the MIT License.

== See also ==
- Alef (programming language)
- Rendezvous (Plan 9)
- Inferno (operating system)
