= K&R =

K&R may refer to:

- Kernighan and Ritchie (Brian Kernighan and Dennis Ritchie)
  - The C Programming Language (book), a book written by Brian Kernighan and Dennis Ritchie
  - K&R C, the original dialect of the C programming language, introduced by the first edition of the book
  - K&R indent style, used in the book
- K&R Insurance, a kidnap and ransom insurance
