= The Practice of Programming =

Book by Rob Pike

- Author: Brian W. Kernighan and Rob Pike
- Language: English
- Subject: Computer programming
- Publisher: Addison–Wesley
- Publication date: 1999
- ISBN: 0-201-61586-X
- Website: www.cs.princeton.edu/~bwk/tpop.webpage/

The Practice of Programming (ISBN 0-201-61586-X) by Brian W. Kernighan and Rob Pike is a 1999 book about computer programming and software engineering, published by Addison-Wesley.

According to the preface, the book is about "topics like testing, debugging, portability, performance, design alternatives, and style", which, according to the authors, "are not usually the focus of computer science or programming courses". It treats these topics in case studies, featuring implementations in several programming languages (mostly C, but also C++, AWK, Perl, Tcl and Java).

The Practice of Programming has been translated into twelve languages. Eric S. Raymond, in The Art of Unix Programming, calls it "recommended reading for all C programmers (indeed for all programmers in any language)". A 2008 review on LWN.net found that TPOP "has aged well due to its focus on general principles" and that "beginners will benefit most but experienced developers will appreciate [...] the later chapters".
