= Ratfor =

Programming language

- Developer: Brian Kernighan
- First appeared: 1976
- Website: sepwww.stanford.edu

Influenced by
- Fortran, C

Ratfor (short for Rational Fortran) is a programming language implemented as a preprocessor for Fortran 66. It provides modern control structures, unavailable in Fortran 66, to replace GOTOs and statement numbers.

== Features ==
Ratfor provides the following kinds of flow-control statements, described by Kernighan and Plauger as "shamelessly stolen from the language C, developed for the UNIX operating system by D.M. Ritchie" ("Software Tools", p. 318):

- statement grouping with braces
- if-else, while, for, do, repeat-until, break, next
- "free-form" statements, i.e., not constrained by Fortran format rules
- <, >, >=, ... in place of .LT., .GT., .GE., ...
- include
- # comments

For example, the following code

if (a > b) {
  max = a
} else {
  max = b
}

might be translated as

      IF(.NOT.(A.GT.B))GOTO 1
      MAX = A
      GOTO 2
    1 CONTINUE
      MAX = B
    2 CONTINUE

The version of Ratfor in Software Tools is written in Ratfor, as are the sample programs, and inasmuch as its own translation to Fortran is available, it can be ported to any Fortran system. Ratfor source code file names end in .r or .rat.

== History ==
Ratfor was designed and implemented by Brian Kernighan at Bell Telephone Laboratories in 1974, and described in Software—Practice & Experience in 1975. It was used in the 1976 book Software Tools by Kernighan and P.J. Plauger.

In 1977, at Purdue University, an improved version of the Ratfor preprocessor was written. It was called Mouse4, as it was smaller and faster than Ratfor. A published document by Dr. Douglas Comer, professor at Purdue, concluded "contrary to the evidence exhibited by the designer of Ratfor, sequential search is often inadequate for production software. Furthermore, in the case of lexical analysis, well-known techniques do seem to offer efficiency while retaining the simplicity, ease of coding and modularity of ad hoc methods." (CSD-TR236).

In comparison to the Ratfor preprocessor on a program of 3000 source lines running on a CDC 6500 system took 185.470 CPU seconds. That was cut by 50% when binary search was used in the Ratfor code. Rewriting the ad hoc lexical scanner using a standard method based on finite automata reduced run time to 12.723 seconds.

With the availability of Fortran 77, a successor named Ratfiv (Ratfor=rat4 => rat5=Ratfiv) could, with an option /f77, output a more readable Fortran 77 code:

      IF (A .GT. B) THEN
        MAX = A
      ELSE
        MAX = B
      ENDIF

Initial Ratfor source code was ported to C in 1985 and improved to produce Fortran 77 code too. A git tree has been set in 2010 in order to revive ratfor . Although the GNU C compiler had the ability to directly compile a Ratfor file (.r) without keeping a useless intermediate Fortran code (.f) (gcc foo.r), this functionality was lost in version 4 during the move in 2005 from f77 to GNU Fortran.

The original source was available in .deb and .rpm forms at its original site, mirror.corbina.net/mandriva/, and its archive, www.dgate.org/ratfor/ are gone as of April, 2024. Source tarballs are still available at the Internet Archive.

== Ratfiv ==
Ratfiv is an enhanced version of the Ratfor programming language, a preprocessor for Fortran designed to give it C-like capabilities. Fortran was widely used for scientific programming but had very basic control-flow primitives ("do" and "goto") and no "macro" facility which limited its expressiveness.

The name of the language is a pun (Ratfor (RATional FORtran) -> "Rat Four" -> "Rat Five" -> RatFiv).

Ratfiv was developed by Bill Wood at the Institute for Cancer Research, Philadelphia, PA in the early 1980s and released on several DECUS (Digital Equipment Users Group) SIG (Special Interest Group) tapes. It is based on the original Ratfor by B. Kernighan and P. J. Plauger, with rewrites and enhancements by David Hanson and friends (U. of Arizona), Joe Sventek and Debbie Scherrer (Lawrence Berkeley National Laboratory).

Ratfiv V2.1 was distributed on the DECUS RSX82a SIG tape.

== See also ==
- EFL
