= Whitesmiths =

Former American software company

- Industry: IT
- Founded: 1978; 48 years ago
- Founder: P. J. Plauger, Mark Krieger and Gabriel Pham
- Headquarters: Westford, Massachusetts

Whitesmiths Ltd. was a software company founded in New York City by P. J. Plauger, Mark Krieger and Gabriel Pham, and last located in Westford, Massachusetts. It sold a Unix-like operating system called Idris, as well as the first commercial C compiler, Whitesmiths C.

The Whitesmiths compiler, first written for the PDP-11, was released in 1978, and compiled a version of C similar to that accepted by Version 6 Unix (Dennis Ritchie's original C compiler). It was an entirely new implementation, borrowing no code from Unix. Today, it is mainly remembered for lending its name to a particular indentation style, originally used in the code examples which accompanied it. Whitesmith's first customer for their C compiler was Fischer & Porter, a process control company then located in Warminster, Pennsylvania. Besides PDP-11, the compiler had code generators for Intel 8080/Zilog Z80, Motorola MC68000, and VAX-11, and it was commonly used as a cross compiler. Whitesmiths also developed a Pascal front-end for the compiler, that emitted C-language code for input to the C compiler.

By 1983 Whitesmiths was one of several vendors of Unix-like operating systems. That year Whitesmiths formed a technical and business alliance with France-based COSMIC Software. At that time, Whitesmiths published 16-bit compilers for machines like PDP-11 while COSMIC published 8-bit compilers for Intel and Motorola CPUs. This technology alliance improved compilers for both markets. Whitesmiths was actively involved in developing the original ANSI C standard supplying several members to the standards committee and hosting some technical sessions. They were one of the first suppliers of an ANSI C compliant compiler.

The company's president from 1978 to 1988 was P. J. Plauger. Whitesmiths merged with Intermetrics in December 1988, leading to further mergers and acquisitions.
