= Hoc (programming language) =

hoc
- Original author(s): Brian Kernighan, Rob Pike (AT&T Bell Laboratories)
- Initial release: 1984; 41 years ago
- Repository: netlib.bell-labs.com/~bwk/hoc.sh
- Written in: C
- Operating system: Unix, Plan 9
- Platform: Cross-platform
- Type: Programming language, Command
- License: Plan 9: MIT License

hoc, an acronym for High Order Calculator, is an interpreted programming language that was used in the 1984 book The Unix Programming Environment to demonstrate how to build interpreters using Yacc.

hoc was developed by Brian Kernighan and Rob Pike as a glorified interactive calculator. Its basic functionality is to evaluate floating-point numerical expressions, e.g., 1+2*sin(0.7). Then, variables were added, conditionals, loops, user-defined functions, simple IO, and more, using a syntax resembling C.

An improved hoc interpreter was included in Eighth Edition Research Unix in 1985, but it has not been generally adopted by commercial Unix systems or by Linux distributions. Instead, the earlier calculator languages dc and bc have become widespread on those systems. hoc survived and continued to evolve as part of the Plan 9 operating system. Several improved versions of hoc were released as free software by Bell Labs and other individuals (see list below). hoc is used, alongside python, as a scripting language for the Neuron simulator.

== Examples ==
The following is a simple example of an interactive calculator session in hoc; highlighted text represents hoc's output:

 1+2*3
     7
 angle=PI/3
 r=sin(angle)
 r
     0.866025
 r*2
     1.73205

And a simple example of functions and flow control:

 func atan2(){
         if ($1>0){
                 return atan($2/$1)
         } else if ($1<0){
                 return atan($2/$1)+PI
         } else if ($2>0){
                 return PI/2
         } else if ($2<0){
                 return -PI/2
         } else {
                 print "atan2 domain error"
                 return 0
         }
 }
 
 atan2(2,3)
     0.982794
 atan2(0,0)
 atan2 domain error
     0.0
