= One-liner =

One-liner may refer to:

- One-line joke
- One-liner program, textual input to the command-line of an operating system shell that performs some function in just one line of input
- Tagline, a variant of a branding slogan typically used in marketing materials and advertising
- one-line haiku

== See also ==
- Aphorism
