= The Art of Unix Programming =

Book about computing

- Author: Eric S. Raymond
- Subject: Unix programming
- Genre: Non-fiction
- Publisher: Addison-Wesley
- Publication date: 2003
- ISBN: 0-13-142901-9
- Website: www.catb.org/~esr/writings/taoup/

The Art of Unix Programming by Eric S. Raymond is a book about the history and culture of Unix programming from its earliest days in 1969 to 2003 when it was published, covering both genetic derivations such as BSD and conceptual ones such as Linux.

The author utilizes a comparative approach to explaining Unix by contrasting it to other operating systems including desktop-oriented ones such as Microsoft Windows and the classic Mac OS to ones with research roots such as EROS and Plan 9 from Bell Labs. The book was published by Addison-Wesley, September 17, 2003, ISBN 0-13-142901-9 and is also available online, under a Creative Commons license with additional clauses.

== Contributors ==
The book contains many contributions, quotations and comments from UNIX gurus past and present. These include:

- Ken Arnold (author of curses and co-author of Rogue)
- Steve Bellovin
- Stuart Feldman
- Jim Gettys
- Stephen C. Johnson
- Brian Kernighan
- David Korn
- Mike Lesk
- Doug McIlroy
- Marshall Kirk McKusick
- Keith Packard
- Henry Spencer
- Ken Thompson

== See also ==
- Unix philosophy
- The Hacker Ethic and the Spirit of the Information Age
