= Mawk =

Mawk can refer to:

- Mawk, an implementation of the AWK programming language
- Mark "Mawk" Young, former bassist for the band Hed PE
