= S/ =

S/ may refer to

- Sed#Substitution command
- The currency sign for the Peruvian sol
