= Graph Coarsening Algorithm =

- Class: Graph theory, Combinatorial optimization, Parallel computing
- Average performance: $O(|E|)$ or $O(|V| + |E|)$ (depending on the matching method)

A Graph Coarsening Algorithm is a family of metaheuristic algorithms used to reduce the size and complexity of a large graph while preserving its key structural properties. These algorithms form the core of multilevel frameworks, which transform complex optimization problems on massive graphs into smaller, more manageable ones.

The coarsening process involves merging nodes of a graph into clusters called supernodes and aggregating the edges between these clusters to create a new, smaller graph. This process is applied iteratively until the graph is small enough. Then, the original problem (such as partitioning or clustering) is solved on the final small graph, and the solution is progressively mapped back to the larger, original graphs.

== Core concepts ==
The main objective of coarsening is to create a sequence of graphs $G_0, G_1, \dots, G_k$, where $G_0$ is the input graph, and each graph $G_{i+1}$ is a smaller version of $G_i$, such that the number of nodes decreases significantly: $|V_0| > |V_1| > \dots > |V_k|$.

This process is based on two main operations:

1. Formation of Supernodes: In each step, the nodes of graph $G_i$ are partitioned into several groups based on a specific strategy. Each group of nodes becomes a single supernode in the next graph $G_{i+1}$.
2. Determination of Superedges: The edges between supernodes (superedges) in $G_{i+1}$ are created based on the edges between their corresponding nodes in $G_i$. The weight of a superedge is typically the sum of the weights of the edges connecting the two corresponding groups of nodes.

The quality of the coarsening depends on how well the smaller graph can preserve the important properties of the original graph, such as its cut structure.

== Coarsening strategies ==
The selection of nodes for merging is the most critical part of the algorithm and directly impacts the quality of the final solution. This selection is usually performed through matching algorithms on the graph.

=== Heavy Edge Matching (HEM) ===
This is one of the most effective and widely used strategies, implemented in popular software packages like Metis and Scotch. In HEM, priority is given to merging nodes connected by high-weight (heavy) edges. The rationale is that nodes with strong connections are more likely to belong in the same partition or cluster.

The general steps of the HEM algorithm are as follows:

1. The graph's nodes are visited in a random order.
2. For each unmatched node $v$, the incident edge with the highest weight, $(v, u)$, is considered.
3. If the node $u$ is also unmatched, the two nodes are matched and selected to form a supernode.
4. This process continues until no more matches can be made.

=== Random matching (RM) ===
In this strategy, nodes are randomly paired with one of their neighbors. This method is very fast but may overlook important structural properties of the graph, as it treats heavy and light edges equally. RM is typically used when speed is prioritized over quality or when the graph is unweighted.

== Role in the multilevel partitioning framework ==
Coarsening is rarely used in isolation; it is typically the first phase of a three-stage framework known as multilevel partitioning. This framework is highly effective for solving NP-hard problems like graph partition.

1. Phase 1: Coarsening: The original graph is iteratively coarsened until it becomes a small, manageable graph (usually with a few hundred nodes).
2. Phase 2: Initial Partitioning: The final small graph is partitioned using a precise algorithm. Since the graph is small, this step is computationally fast.
3. Phase 3: Uncoarsening and Refinement: The partition is progressively projected back to the larger, original graphs. At each stage of uncoarsening, the partition boundaries are refined using local optimization algorithms like the Kernighan–Lin algorithm to improve the cut quality.

This combined approach allows the algorithm to have both a global view of the graph structure (during the coarsening phase) and a local view for fine-tuning (during the refinement phase).

== Advanced coarsening techniques ==
With the emergence of new applications in machine learning and complex data analysis, traditional coarsening methods have been supplemented with modern approaches:

- Feature-Aware Coarsening: In Graph Neural Networks (GNNs), nodes have feature vectors. These methods aim to merge nodes that are not only structurally close but also similar in their features.
- Spectral Coarsening: These methods attempt to preserve the spectral properties of the graph (such as the eigenvalues and eigenvectors of its Laplacian matrix) in the coarsened graph. These properties are crucial for clustering and partitioning.
- Machine Learning-Based Coarsening: In this approach, learning models, particularly GNNs, are used to learn the best strategy for merging nodes. The model learns which nodes should be merged to preserve useful information for a specific task (like node classification).

== Applications ==
Graph coarsening algorithms are used in various fields:

- VLSI Design: In the design of large integrated circuits, a circuit is modeled as a hypergraph. Partitioning this hypergraph is essential for optimal resource allocation and minimizing wiring. Hypergraph coarsening helps solve this problem at a large scale.
- Image processing: Images can be modeled as graphs where pixels are nodes and the similarity between pixels defines the edge weights. Coarsening is used for image segmentation at different scales to identify meaningful regions.
- Social network analysis: In social networks with millions of users, coarsening is used for community detection, identifying influential users, and simplifying network analysis.
- Scientific Computing: In scientific simulations (such as fluid dynamics), problems are defined on a large mesh. To solve these problems on parallel computers, the mesh must be partitioned among processors. Coarsening the graph corresponding to the mesh manages this process effectively.
- Machine Learning on Graphs: In Graph Neural Networks, the coarsening operation (referred to as pooling in this context) is used to reduce the dimensionality of the data and learn hierarchical representations of the graph.

== Advantages and disadvantages ==
=== Advantages ===
- Speed and Efficiency: Coarsening drastically reduces the problem size, making complex algorithms feasible for massive graphs.
- High Quality: The multilevel approach, combining global and local perspectives, typically produces higher-quality solutions than single-level algorithms.
- Scalability: These algorithms are scalable to graphs with billions of edges.

=== Disadvantages ===
- Information Loss: The process of merging nodes inevitably leads to a loss of some structural details, which can negatively affect the optimality of the final solution.
- Heuristic-Dependent: The quality of the coarsened graph is highly dependent on the coarsening strategy (e.g., HEM), and there is no guarantee of optimality.
- Implementation Complexity: Implementing a full multilevel framework is more complex than simpler, single-level algorithms.

== See also ==
- Graph theory
- Graph partition
- Graph neural network
- Cluster analysis
- Kernighan–Lin algorithm
