= EFL (programming language) =

EFL is a programming language originated by programmer A.D. Hall in the late 1970s and completed by Stuart Feldman. It was intended to improve on Fortran by adding control structures similar to those of C and was implemented as a preprocessor to a Fortran compiler. Its name is an initialism for Extended Fortran Language. It is roughly a superset of Ratfor.
