= The AWK Programming Language =

- First edition
- Author: Alfred V. Aho, Brian W. Kernighan, and Peter J. Weinberger
- Language: English
- Publisher: Addison Wesley
- Publication date: 1 Jan. 1988 (1st Edition); 5 Sep. 2023 (2nd Edition)
- Pages: 210
- ISBN: 978-0201079814
- Website: 1st ed; 2nd ed

The AWK Programming Language is a well-known 1988 book written by Alfred V. Aho, Brian W. Kernighan, and Peter J. Weinberger and published by Addison-Wesley, often referred to as the gray book. The book describes the AWK programming language and is the de facto standard for the language, written by its inventors. W. Richard Stevens, author of several UNIX books including Advanced Programming in the Unix Environment, cites the book as one of his favorite technical books. The book is translated to several languages and is cited by many technical papers in the ACM journals.

According to the book's frontmatter the book was typeset "using an Autologic APS-5 phototypesetter and a DEC VAX 8550 running the 9th Edition of the UNIX operating system".

In September 2023, the second edition was published by Addison-Wesley, along with an accompanying website.

== Books ==
- Aho, Alfred V.; Kernighan, Brian W.; Weinberger, Peter J. (1988-01-01). The AWK Programming Language. New York, NY: Addison-Wesley. ISBN 0-201-07981-X.
- Aho, Alfred V.; Kernighan, Brian W.; Weinberger, Peter J. (2023-09-06). The AWK Programming Language, Second Edition. Hoboken, New Jersey: Addison-Wesley Professional. ISBN 978-0-13-826972-2. Archived from the original on 2023-10-27.
