= Peggy A. Kidwell =

American historian of science

Peggy Aldrich Kidwell is an American historian of science, formerly the curator of mathematics at the National Museum of American History.

== Education ==
Kidwell graduated from Grinnell College in 1971. She went to Yale University for graduate study, earning an M. Phil. in 1974 and completing her Ph.D. in 1979. Her doctoral dissertation was Solar radiation and heat from Kepler to Helmholtz (1600–1860).

== Books ==
Kidwell is the co-author of:

- Landmarks in Digital Computing: A Smithsonian Pictorial History (with Paul E. Ceruzzi, Smithsonian Institution Press, 1994)
- Tools of American Mathematics Teaching, 1800–2000 (with Amy Ackerberg-Hastings and David Lindsay Roberts, Johns Hopkins University Press, 2008)

With Michael R. Williams, she is the translator and editor of:

- The Calculating Machines (Die Rechenmaschinen): Their History and Development (by Ernst Martin, MIT Press, 1992).

== Recognition ==
In 2018, Kidwell was named as a Fellow of the American Physical Society (APS), after a nomination from the APS Forum on the History of Physics, "for distinguished contributions to the history of physics, astronomy, and mathematics, particularly the work of women in these fields, the development of Harvard College Observatory, and the history of mathematical theory, instruments of computation, and mathematics education".
