= Idris (operating system) =

- Idris and the X Window System running on an Atari Mega ST
- Developer: P. J. Plauger (Whitesmiths)
- OS family: Unix-like
- Working state: Historic
- Initial release: 1979; 46 years ago
- Available in: English
- Supported platforms: PDP-11, VAX, Motorola 68000, System/370, Intel 8086, Atari ST, Apple Macintosh, INMOS T800
- Default user interface: Command-line interface, GUI (X Window System)
- License: Proprietary commercial software

Idris is a discontinued multi-tasking, Unix-like, multi-user, real-time operating system released by Whitesmiths, of Westford, Massachusetts. The product was commercially available from 1979 through 1988.

== Background ==
Idris was originally written for the PDP-11 by P. J. Plauger, who started working on Idris in August 1978. It was binary compatible with Unix V6 on PDP-11, but it could run on non-memory managed systems (like LSI-11 or PDP-11/23) as well. The kernel required 31 KB of RAM, and the C compiler (provided along with the standard V6 toolset) had more or less the same size.

== Ports ==
Although Idris was initially available for the PDP-11, it was later ported to run on a number of platforms, such as the VAX, Motorola 68000, System/370 and Intel 8086. There was also a version that used bank-switching for memory management, that ran on the Intel 8080.

In 1986, David M. Stanhope at Computer Tools International ported Idris to the Atari ST and developed its ROM boot cartridge. This work also included a port of X to Idris. Computer Tools and Whitesmiths offered it to Atari as a replacement for Atari TOS, but eventually marketed it directly to ST enthusiasts.

A specific version of Idris (CoIdris) was packaged as a .COM file under DOS and used it for low level I/O services.

Idris was ported to the Apple Macintosh (as MacIdris) by John O'Brien (of Whitesmiths Australia) and remained available until the early 1990s. MacIdris ran as an application under the Finder or MultiFinder.

After Whitesmiths had been merged with Intermetrics, Idris – along with its development toolchain – was ported by Real Time Systems Ltd to the INMOS T800 transputer architecture for the Parsytec SN1000 multiprocessor.
