= P. J. Plauger =

American novelist

P.J. Plauger
- Born: Phillip James Plauger; January 13, 1944 (age 82); Petersburg, West Virginia
- Education: Princeton University; Michigan State University
- Occupations: Entrepreneur and writer
- Writing career
- Genre: Science fiction
- Notable work: "Child of All Ages"
- Notable awards: John W. Campbell Award (1975)
- Website: www.plauger.com (archive)

Phillip James (P.J. or Bill) Plauger (/ˈpiˌdʒeɪ ˈplɔːɡər/; born January 13, 1944, Petersburg, West Virginia) is an author, entrepreneur and computer programmer. He has written and co-written articles and books about programming style, software tools, and the C programming language, as well as works of science fiction.

== Personal life and career ==
Plauger worked at Bell Labs from 1969 to 1975, where he coauthored The Elements of Programming Style and Software Tools with Brian Kernighan. In 1978, he founded Whitesmiths, the first company to sell a C compiler and Unix-like operating system (Idris). He has since been involved in C and C++ standardization and is now the president of Dinkumware. In January 2009 he became the convener of the ISO C++ standards committee, but in October 2009 he tendered his resignation after failing to pass a resolution to stop processing any new features in order to facilitate the promised shipping date for the C++0x standard.

Plauger has been credited with inventing pair programming while leading Whitesmiths Ltd.

Plauger has written a number of science fiction stories, notably "Child of All Ages", first published in the March 1975 issue of Analog, which features a protagonist who has achieved immortality at the cost of never growing beyond childhood. The story was nominated for the Hugo and Nebula awards in 1976. Plauger won the John W. Campbell Award for Best New Writer in 1975—notably beating John Varley for the award—and subsequently sold a story to The Last Dangerous Visions.

Plauger holds a bachelor's degree in physics from Princeton University and a PhD in nuclear physics from Michigan State University.

== Dinkumware ==
Dinkumware, Ltd.
- Type: Private
- Industry: Software
- Headquarters: Concord, Massachusetts, US
- Key people: P.J. Plauger, Pete Becker
- Products: Dinkum C++ library Dinkum C++ Library Reference; Dinkum C Library Reference; Dinkum CoreX Library
- Website: www.dinkumware.com (archive)

Dinkumware is an American software company specializing in core libraries for C/C++, owned and operated by P.J. Plauger. It is based in Concord, Massachusetts.

The company has provided the C++ Standard Library implementation that ships with Microsoft Visual C++ since 1996 and Embarcadero C++Builder since 2005, and supplies C++ and Embedded C++ libraries to the embedded community. It also provides libraries for Java and other tools, including "proofers" to test for library adherence to the standard.

== Nonfiction works ==
- The Elements of Programming Style (1974, revised 1978) with Brian W. Kernighan
- Software Tools (1976) with Brian W. Kernighan
- Software Tools in Pascal (1981) with Brian W. Kernighan
- The Standard C library (1992)
- Programming on Purpose, collected essays from the magazine Computer Language
  - Volume I: Essays on Software Design (1992)
  - Volume II: Essays on Software People (1993)
  - Volume III: Essays on Software Technology (1993)
- The Draft Standard C++ Library (1995)
- Standard C: A Reference (1989, revised 1992, revised 1996) with Jim Brodie
- The C++ Standard Template Library (2001) with Alexander Stepanov, Meng Lee, and David Musser
