= Stuart Feldman =

American computer scientist

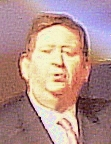
- Stuart Feldman in 2007
- Education: Princeton University (A.B.); Massachusetts Institute of Technology (Ph.D.)
- Known for: Make; ACM Queue; President of ACM, 2006–08
- Scientific career
- Fields: Computer science
- Workplaces: Bell Labs; Bellcore; IBM; Google; Schmidt Philanthropies

Stuart Feldman is an American computer scientist. He is best known as the creator of the computer software program Make. He was also an author of the first Fortran 77 compiler, was part of the original group at Bell Labs that created the Unix operating system, and participated in development of the ALTRAN and EFL programming languages.

Feldman is the president of Schmidt Sciences. He was previously Chief Scientist at Schmidt Futures, and was a member of the dean's External Advisory Board at the University of Michigan School of Information. He was previously Vice President, Engineering, East Coast, at Google, and before that Vice President of Computer Science at IBM Research. Feldman has served on the board of the Computing Research Association (CRA) and of the Association to Advance Collegiate Schools of Business (AACSB International). He was chair of ACM SIGPLAN and founding chair of ACM SIGecom. He was elected the President of the ACM in 2006. Feldman is also a member of the Editorial Advisory Board of ACM Queue, a magazine he helped found with Steve Bourne. He has also served on the editorial boards of IEEE Internet Computing and IEEE Transactions on Software Engineering. He received an A.B. in astrophysical sciences from Princeton University and a Ph.D. in applied mathematics from the Massachusetts Institute of Technology. In 2010 the University of Waterloo awarded him an Honorary Doctorate of Mathematics.

Feldman became a Fellow of the IEEE in 1991, Fellow of the ACM in 1995, and Fellow of the AAAS in 2007. In 2003, he was awarded ACM's Software System Award for his creation of Make.
