= Paul E. Ceruzzi =

Paul Ceruzzi
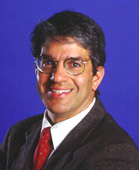
- Born: 1949 (age 76–77)
- Education: Yale University (BA); University of Kansas (PhD)
- Scientific career
- Fields: Aerospace electronics, computing, microelectronics, missile guidance & control
- Workplaces: Smithsonian's National Air and Space Museum

Paul E. Ceruzzi (born 1949) is curator emeritus at the Smithsonian's National Air and Space Museum in Washington, D.C.

== Life ==
Ceruzzi received a BA from Yale University in 1970 and received a PhD from the University of Kansas in 1981, both in American studies. Before joining the National Air and Space Museum, he was a Fulbright scholar in Hamburg, Germany, and taught History of Technology at Clemson University in Clemson, South Carolina. Ceruzzi is the author and co-author of several books on the history of computing and aerospace technology. He has curated or assisted in the mounting of several exhibitions at NASM, including: Beyond the Limits - Flight Enters the Computer Age, The Global Positioning System - A New Constellation, Space Race, How Things Fly and the James McDonnell Space Hangar of the museum's Steven F. Udvar-Hazy Center, at Dulles Airport.

== Works ==
- Reckoners: The Prehistory of The Digital Computer (1983)
- Beyond the Limits: Flight Enters the Computer Age (1989)
- Landmarks in Digital Computing: A Smithsonian Pictorial History (with Peggy A. Kidwell, 1994)
- A History of Modern Computing (1998)
- Ceruzzi, Paul E (May 2003). A History of Modern Computing (2nd ed.). MIT Press. pp. 445. ISBN 978-0-262-53203-7.
- Internet Alley: High Technology in Tysons Corner, 1945-2005 (2008).
- Computing: A Concise History (2012)
- GPS (2018)
- A New History of Modern Computing (with Thomas Haigh, 2021)
