= Brian Kernighan =

Canadian computer scientist (born 1942)

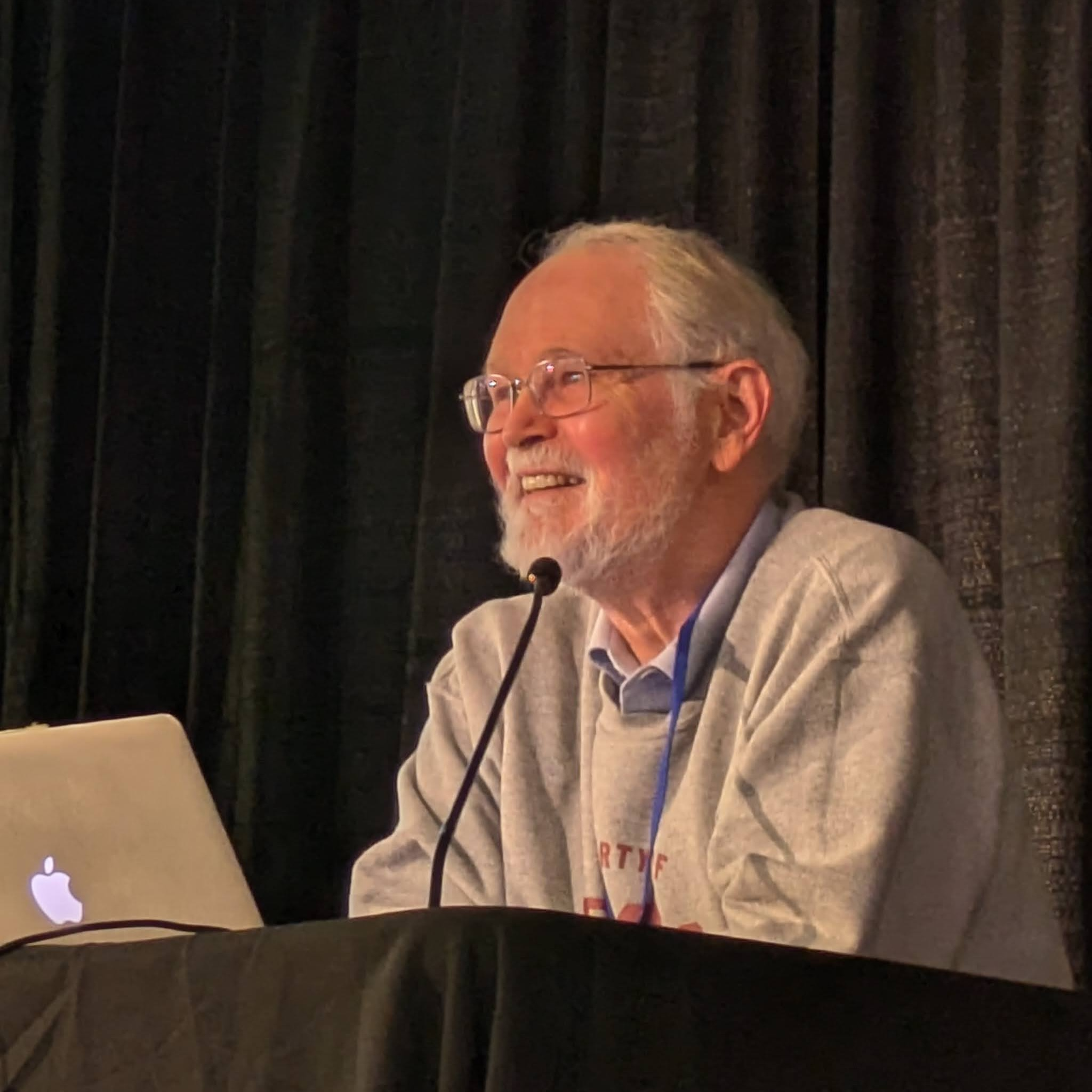
- Brian Kernighan presenting at Vintage Computer Festival East in April 2025
- Born: Brian Wilson Kernighan; 30 January 1942 (age 84); Toronto, Ontario, Canada
- Citizenship: Canada
- Education: University of Toronto (BASc); Princeton University (PhD)
- Known for: Unix; AWK; A Mathematical Programming Language (AMPL); Kernighan–Lin algorithm; Lin–Kernighan heuristic; The C Programming Language (book)
- Scientific career
- Fields: Computer science
- Workplaces: Princeton University
- Thesis: Some Graph Partitioning Problems Related to Program Segmentation (1969)
- Doctoral advisor: Peter Weiner
- Website: www.cs.princeton.edu/~bwk/

Brian Wilson Kernighan (/ˈkɜːrnɪhæn/; born 30 January 1942) is a Canadian computer scientist. He worked at Bell Labs and contributed to the development of Unix alongside Unix creators Ken Thompson and Dennis Ritchie. Kernighan's name became widely known through co-authorship of the first book on the C programming language (The C Programming Language) with Dennis Ritchie. Kernighan affirmed that he had no part in the design of the C language ("it's entirely Dennis Ritchie's work").

Kernighan authored many Unix programs, including ditroff. He is coauthor of the AWK and AMPL programming languages. The "K" of K&R C and of AWK both stand for "Kernighan".

In collaboration with Shen Lin he devised well-known heuristics for two NP-complete optimization problems: graph partitioning and the travelling salesman problem. In a display of authorial equity, the former is usually called the Kernighan–Lin algorithm, while the latter is known as the Lin–Kernighan heuristic.

Kernighan has been a professor of computer science at Princeton University since 2000 and is the director of undergraduate studies in the department of computer science.

In 2015, he co-authored the book The Go Programming Language.

== Early life and education ==
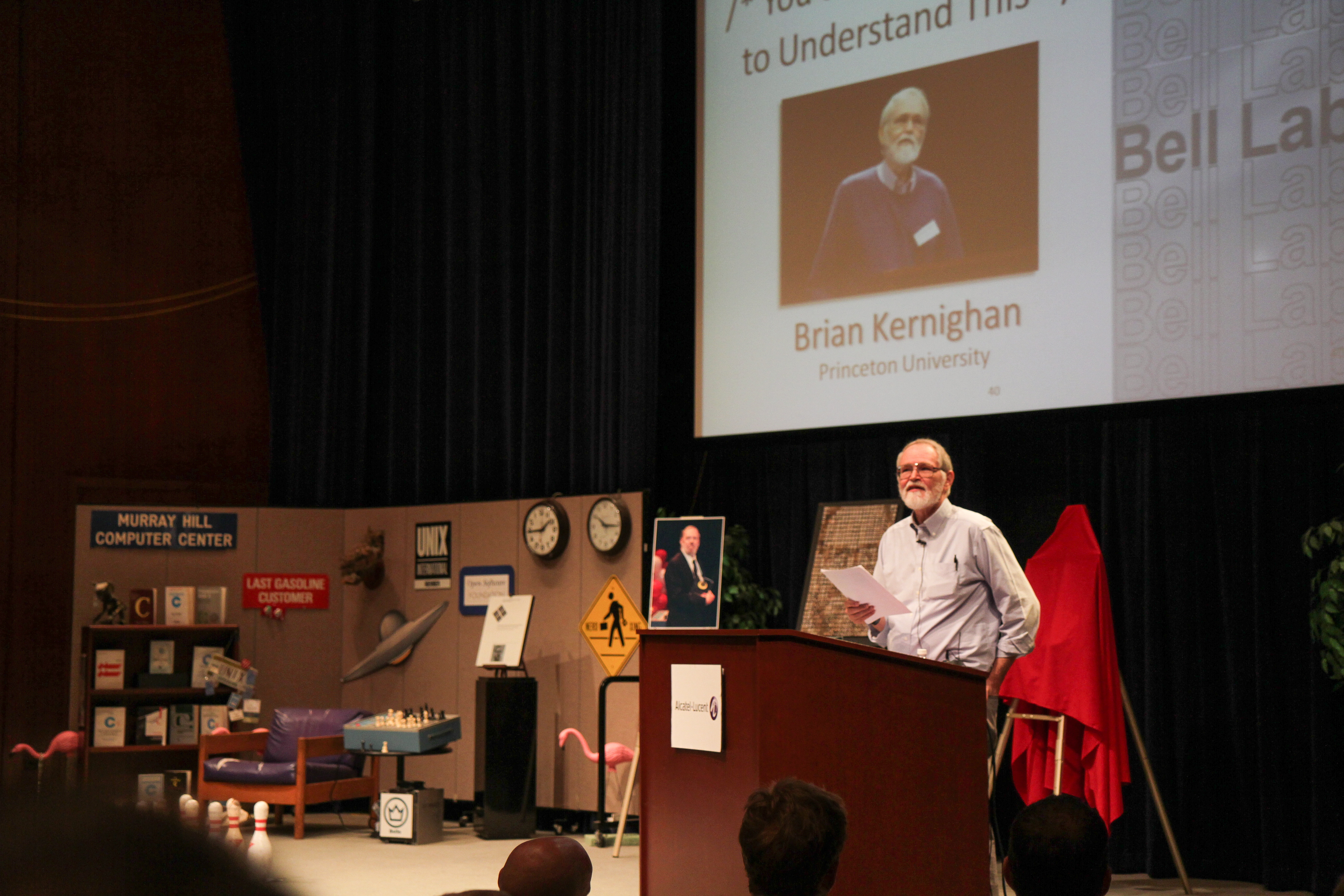
Brian Kernighan speaks at a tribute to Dennis Ritchie in 2012 at Bell Labs.

Kernighan was born in Toronto. He attended the University of Toronto between 1960 and 1964, earning his bachelor's degree in engineering physics. He received his Ph.D. in electrical engineering from Princeton University in 1969, completing a doctoral dissertation titled "Some graph partitioning problems related to program segmentation" under the supervision of Peter G. Weiner.

== Career and research ==
Kernighan has held a professorship in the department of computer science at Princeton since 2000. Each fall he teaches a course called "Computers in Our World", which introduces the fundamentals of computing to non-majors.

Kernighan was the software editor for Prentice Hall International. His "Software Tools" series spread the essence of "C/Unix thinking" with makeovers for BASIC, FORTRAN, and Pascal, and most notably his "Ratfor" (rational FORTRAN) was put in the public domain.

He has said that if stranded on an island with only one programming language it would have to be C.

Kernighan coined the term "Unix" and helped popularize Thompson's Unix philosophy. Kernighan is also known for coining the expression "What You See Is All You Get" (WYSIAYG), which is a sarcastic variant of the original "What You See Is What You Get" (WYSIWYG). Kernighan's term is used to indicate that WYSIWYG systems might throw away information in a document that could be useful in other contexts.

In 1972, Kernighan described memory management in strings using "hello" and "world", in the B programming language, which became the iconic example we know today. Kernighan's original 1978 implementation of hello, world! was sold at The Algorithm Auction, the world's first auction of computer algorithms.

In 1996, Kernighan taught CS50 which is the Harvard University introductory course in computer science. Kernighan was an influence on David J. Malan who subsequently taught the course and scaled it up to run at multiple universities and in multiple digital formats.

Kernighan was elected a member of the National Academy of Engineering in 2002 for contributions to software and to programming languages. He was also elected a member of the American Academy of Arts and Sciences in 2019.

In 2022, Kernighan stated that he was actively working on improvements to the AWK programming language, which he took part in creating in 1977.

=== Books and reports ===
- The Elements of Programming Style, with P. J. Plauger
- Software Tools, a book and set of tools for Ratfor, co-created in part with P. J. Plauger
- Software Tools in Pascal, a book and set of tools for Pascal, with P. J. Plauger
- The AWK Programming Language, with Alfred V. Aho, and Peter J. Weinberger
- The C Programming Language, with C creator Dennis Ritchie, the first book on C
- The Practice of Programming, with Rob Pike
- The Unix Programming Environment, a tutorial book, with Rob Pike
- "Why Pascal is Not My Favorite Programming Language", a popular criticism of Niklaus Wirth's Pascal. Some parts of the criticism are obsolete due to ISO 7185 (Programming Languages - Pascal); the criticism was written before ISO 7185 was created. (AT&T Computing Science Technical Report #100)
- UNIX: A History and a Memoir, a historical account of the development of Unix from the perspective of his role at Bell Labs
- The Go Programming Language, co-authored with Alan Donovan.

=== Programs ===
- 1972: The first documented "Hello, world!" program, in Kernighan's "A Tutorial Introduction to the Language B"
- 1973: ditroff, or "device independent troff", which allowed troff to be used with any device
- 1974: The eqn typesetting language for troff, with Lorinda Cherry
- 1976: Ratfor
- 1977: The m4 macro processing language, with Dennis Ritchie
- 1977: The AWK programming language, with Alfred Aho and Peter J. Weinberger, and its book The AWK Programming Language
- 1985: The AMPL programming language
- 1988: The pic typesetting language for troff

== Publications ==
- The Elements of Programming Style (1974, 1978) with P. J. Plauger
- Software Tools (1976) with P. J. Plauger
- The C Programming Language (1978, 1988) with Dennis M. Ritchie
- Software Tools in Pascal (1981) with P. J. Plauger
- The Unix Programming Environment (1984) with Rob Pike
- The AWK Programming Language (1988, 2023) with Alfred Aho and Peter J. Weinberger
- The Practice of Programming (1999) with Rob Pike
- AMPL: A Modeling Language for Mathematical Programming, 2nd ed. (2003) with Robert Fourer and David Gay
- D is for Digital: What a well-informed person should know about computers and communications (2011)
- The Go Programming Language (2015) with Alan Donovan
- Understanding the Digital World: What You Need to Know about Computers, the Internet, Privacy, and Security (2017)
- Millions, Billions, Zillions: Defending Yourself in a World of Too Many Numbers (2018)
- UNIX: A History and a Memoir (2019)

== See also ==
- List of pioneers in computer science
