= Kernighan–Lin algorithm =

Heuristic algorithm for finding partitions of graphs

The Kernighan–Lin algorithm is a heuristic algorithm for finding partitions of graphs. The algorithm has important practical application in the layout of digital circuits and components in electronic design automation of VLSI.

== Description ==
The input to the algorithm is an undirected graph G = (V, E) with vertex set V, edge set E, and (optionally) numerical weights on the edges in E. The goal of the algorithm is to partition V into two disjoint subsets A and B of equal (or nearly equal) size, in a way that minimizes the sum T of the weights of the subset of edges that cross from A to B. If the graph is unweighted, then instead the goal is to minimize the number of crossing edges; this is equivalent to assigning weight one to each edge. The algorithm maintains and improves a partition, in each pass using a greedy algorithm to pair up vertices of A with vertices of B, so that moving the paired vertices from one side of the partition to the other will improve the partition. After matching the vertices, it then performs a subset of the pairs chosen to have the best overall effect on the solution quality T. Given a graph with n vertices, each pass of the algorithm runs in time O(n^{2} log n).

In more detail, for each $a \in A$, let $I_{a}$ be the internal cost of a, that is, the sum of the costs of edges between a and other nodes in A, and let $E_{a}$ be the external cost of a, that is, the sum of the costs of edges between a and nodes in B. Similarly, define $I_{b}$, $E_{b}$ for each $b \in B$. Furthermore, let

$$D_{s} = E_{s} - I_{s}$$

be the difference between the external and internal costs of s. If a and b are interchanged, then the reduction in cost is

$$T_{old} - T_{new} = D_{a} + D_{b} - 2c_{a,b}$$

where $c_{a,b}$ is the cost of the possible edge between a and b.

The algorithm attempts to find an optimal series of interchange operations between elements of $A$ and $B$ which maximizes $T_{old} - T_{new}$ and then executes the operations, producing a partition of the graph to A and B.

== Pseudocode ==
function Kernighan-Lin(G(V, E)) is
    determine a balanced initial partition of the nodes into sets A and B
    
    do
        compute D values for all a in A and b in B
        let gv, av, and bv be empty lists
        for n := 1 to |V| / 2 do
            find a from A and b from B, such that g = D[a] + D[b] − 2×c(a, b) is maximal
            remove a and b from further consideration in this pass
            add g to gv, a to av, and b to bv
            update D values for the elements of A = A \ a and B = B \ b
        end for
        find k which maximizes g_max, the sum of gv[1], ..., gv[k]
        if g_max > 0 then
            Exchange av[1], av[2], ..., av[k] with bv[1], bv[2], ..., bv[k]
    until (g_max ≤ 0)

    return G(V, E)

== See also ==
- Fiduccia–Mattheyses algorithm
