= Microsoft Word Viewer =

Freeware program

- Word Viewer 2003 running on Windows 8
- Developer: Microsoft
- Final release: v11.8169.8172 SP3 (Word Viewer 2003) / September 27, 2007; 18 years ago
- Operating system: Windows
- Platform: x86
- Available in: 36 languages
- List of languages English, Arabic, Bulgarian, Chinese (Hong Kong SAR), Chinese (Simplified), Chinese (Traditional), Croatian, Czech, Danish, Dutch, English, Estonian, Finnish, French, German, Greek, Hebrew, Hindi, Hungarian, Italian, Japanese, Korean, Latvian, Lithuanian, Norwegian (Bokmål), Polish, Portuguese (Brazil), Portuguese (Portugal), Romanian, Russian, Slovak, Slovenian, Spanish, Swedish, Turkish, Ukrainian
- Type: Document viewer
- License: Freeware

Microsoft Word Viewer is a discontinued freeware program for Microsoft Windows that can display and print Microsoft Word documents. Word Viewer allows text from a Word document to be copied into clipboard and pasted into a word processor. The last version was Word Viewer 2003 Service Pack 3 released in 2007.

According to the license terms of the Microsoft Word Viewer, the software may be installed and used only to view and screen print documents created with Microsoft Office software. The software may not be used for any other purpose. Users may distribute the software only with a file created with Microsoft Office software to enable recipient to view and print the file.

On November 29, 2017, Microsoft announced that Word Viewer would be retired in that month, no longer receive security updates nor be available to download. Microsoft recommended for Windows 10 users to use the Word Mobile application and for Windows 7 and Windows 8 users to upload the file to OneDrive and use Word Online to view and print documents free of charge with a Microsoft account.

== Format support ==
Microsoft Word Viewer supports:

- binary Word documents (.doc)
- Rich Text Format (.rtf)
- Text files (.txt)
- HTML (.htm, .html) and MHTML (.mht, .mhtml)
- Word XML format (.xml)
- WordPerfect v5.x and v6.x files (.wpd)
- Microsoft Works documents (.wps)

The Compatibility Pack for the Word, Excel, and PowerPoint File Formats was released on 6 November 2006, providing support to document formats found in Word 2007:

- Office Open XML documents (.docx, .docm)

== History ==
Word Viewer 6.0 was 16-bit and corresponded to Word 6.0. Word Viewer 7.0 and 7.1 was 32-bit and corresponded to Word 95. Word Viewer 7.1 would execute WordBasic macros without warning. The typical macro virus would not spread, but it could still execute (including any malicious code).

Word Viewer 97 was released with Word 97. It was available for Windows in 32-bit versions. It can display Word documents in Internet Explorer 3.x and later.

Word Viewer 2003 was released on 15 December 2004. This includes many security enhancements over Word Viewer 97, and was the first version of Word Viewer to receive security updates.

Word Viewer 2003 Service Pack 3 was released on 26 September 2007 with Office 2003 SP3. Microsoft continued to provide security updates until February 2019 (mostly because POSReady 2009 shipped with it).

Development of the product has stopped ever since. In the meantime, Microsoft has made other ways of reading Office documents available, either through Word Online as well as WordPad (a native component of Windows) in Windows 7 and later, which can create, view or edit Office Open XML documents (.docx) alongside Rich Text Format (.rtf) and text files (.txt).

No versions for any other operating system besides Windows were ever released.

=== Successors ===
Microsoft Word Viewer was retired in November, 2017. The Word Viewer features were replaced Microsoft Word Mobile. For viewing only, OneDrive or Dropbox allows viewing contents through web browser using Word Online.

== See also ==
- Microsoft Excel Viewer
- Microsoft PowerPoint Viewer
- List of word processors
- Comparison of word processors
