= WordPad =

Basic word processor formerly included with Microsoft Windows

- Screenshot of WordPad in Windows 11
- Developer: Microsoft
- Release: August 24, 1995; 31 years ago
- Final release: 10.0.19041.6280 / August 21, 2025; 14 months ago
- Written in: C++
- Operating system: Windows 95 and higher
- Platform: IA-32, x86-64, and ARM
- Predecessor: Microsoft Write
- Successor: Microsoft Word or Windows Notepad (suggested)
- Type: Word processor
- Repository: WordPad Sample: MFC WordPad Application (early version)

WordPad is a discontinued word processor application designed by Microsoft that was included in versions of Windows from Windows 95 through Windows 11, version 23H2. Similarly to its predecessor Microsoft Write, it served as a basic word processor, positioned as more advanced than the Notepad text editor by supporting rich text editing, but with a subset of the functionality of Microsoft Word. Microsoft removed WordPad starting with Windows 11 24H2 and it has no successor. In September 2026, Microsoft announced that support for WordPad on editions of Windows 10 which are not in the Long-Term Servicing Channel (LTSC) will end on May 11, 2027. Microsoft recommends the use of Microsoft Word for editing DOCX and RTF files and Notepad for editing TXT files instead. The last edition to include WordPad is Windows 10 IoT Enterprise LTSC 2021 (for specialized devices such as medical equipment controllers and ATMs), supported until January 13, 2032, at which point WordPad support fully ends.

Earlier versions primarily supported a subset of the Rich Text Format (RTF, .rtf) and Microsoft Word 6.0 formats, although later versions are also capable of saving Office Open XML (OOXML, .docx) and OpenDocument Text (.odt) files.

== Features ==
WordPad running on Windows CE 5.0

WordPad can format and print text, including font and bold, italic, colored, and centered text, and lacks functions such as a spell checker, thesaurus, and control of pagination. It does not support footnotes and endnotes. WordPad can read, render, and save many Rich Text Format (RTF) features that it cannot create, such as tables, strikeout, superscript, subscript, "extra" colors, text background colors, numbered lists, right and left indentation, quasi-hypertext and URL linking, and line-spacing greater than 1. It is simpler and faster than a richly-featured word processor, with low system resource use. Pasting into WordPad from an HTML document, such as a Web page or email, typically automatically converts most or all of it to RTF, depending partly on the Web browser from which the text is copied. WordPad is suited to taking notes; writing letters and stories; and use on various tablets, PCs, and smart phones. It is unsuitable for work that relies heavily on graphics and typesetting, such as most publishing-industry requirements for rendering final hard copy.

A character not on the keyboard can be entered into WordPad by typing its hexadecimal code point in Unicode followed by Alt+X. Likewise, the code point of a character from another application can be determined by copying it into WordPad followed by Alt+X.

WordPad does not support all the features defined in the RTF/Word 2007 specification. Earlier versions of WordPad also supported the "Word for Windows 6.0" format, which is forward compatible with the Microsoft Word format.

In Windows 95, 98, and 2000, WordPad uses Microsoft's RichEdit control, versions 1.0, 2.0, and 3.0, respectively. In Windows XP SP1 and later, and Windows 7, it uses RichEdit 4.1.

A similar word processor, also called WordPad and with simple functionality, is supplied by some vendors on a Windows CE pre-installation. Its icon resembles an early Microsoft Word icon.

== History ==
Supported file formats
File format	Description
.doc	Microsoft Word Binary File Format; support for this format was removed in Windows Vista
.docx	Office Open XML Document formats; added in Windows 7
.odt	OpenDocument text format; added in Windows 7
.rtf	Rich Text Format
.txt	Text file
.wri	Microsoft Write; disabled in Windows XP SP2 unless registry hack is used. Support was removed in Vista. Microsoft Word 2013 can open such files, but may lose formatting.

WordPad was introduced in Windows 95, replacing Microsoft Write, included with all previous versions of Windows (version 3.11 and earlier). The source code to WordPad was also distributed by Microsoft as a Microsoft Foundation Class Library sample application with MFC 3.2 and later, shortly before the release of Windows 95. It is still available for download from the MSDN website.

The default font used in Windows 95 to Windows Vista was 10pt Arial; in Windows 7 it was changed to 11pt Calibri.

WordPad for Windows 2000/XP added full Unicode support, enabling WordPad to support multiple languages, but big endian UTF-16/UCS-2 is not supported. It can open Microsoft Word (versions 6.0–2003) files, although it opens newer versions of the .doc format with incorrect formatting. Also, unlike previous WordPad versions, it cannot save files in the .doc format (only .txt and .rtf). Files saved as Unicode text are encoded as UTF-16 LE. As a security measure Windows XP Service Pack 2 and later versions of Windows and its service packs reduced support for opening .WRI.

Windows 10 and later versions support voice typing. Windows XP Tablet PC Edition SP2 and Windows Vista include speech recognition, allowing dictation into WordPad. These and later Windows versions implement the RichEdit control, allowing WordPad to support extensible third-party services built using the Text Services Framework (TSF), such as grammar and spellcheck.

In Windows Vista support for reading Microsoft Word DOC files was removed because of the incorrect rendering and formatting problems, and because a Microsoft security bulletin reported a security vulnerability in opening Word files in WordPad. For viewing older (Word 97–2003), and Office Open XML, documents, Microsoft recommends free-of-charge Microsoft Word Viewer. Native Office Open XML and ODF 1.1 support was implemented in the Windows 7 version of WordPad.

In Windows 7 the program's user interface was updated to use a ribbon, similar to those in Microsoft Office.

In January 2020, a Windows Insider build of Windows 10 tested an advertisement steering WordPad users to Office web apps.

=== Discontinuation ===
In September 2023, Microsoft announced that WordPad will be removed from "a future release of Windows", recommending Windows Notepad and Microsoft Word. In January 2024, WordPad was no longer auto-installed after a clean installation of the OS with the release of the Windows 11 Build 26020 Insider Preview's Canary Channel. Furthermore, Microsoft stated that WordPad will be officially removed in future updates, and it will not be available for reinstallation. Microsoft recommended using Microsoft Word for rich text documents like .doc and .rtf, while Notepad is suggested for plain text documents like .txt. In September 2026, Microsoft announced that it would end support for WordPad on GAC editions of Windows 10 when enrolled to get Extended Security Updates (ESU) effective May 11, 2027. After that, WordPad will be only supported on Windows 10 Enterprise 2019 LTSC and Windows 10 IoT Enterprise LTSC 2021 through the end of their respective lifecycles, ending all support for WordPad on all editions of Windows after more than 36 years.

== See also ==
- Jarte – a word processor based on the WordPad engine
- TextEdit
- List of word processors
- Comparison of word processors
