= Yojimbo (disambiguation) =

Yojimbo is a 1961 film directed by Akira Kurosawa and starring Toshiro Mifune.

Yojimbo may also refer to:

- Yojimbo (software), a personal information manager for MacOS
- Yojimbo (Final Fantasy), a character in Final Fantasy X

== See also ==
- Usagi Yojimbo, a comic book series
- Yo-Jin-Bo, a 2005 visual novel
