= Microsoft Write =

Basic word processor formerly included with Microsoft Windows

- Screenshot of Windows Write running on Windows NT 3.51
- Developer(s): Microsoft
- Initial release: 1985
- Operating system: Microsoft Windows
- Successor: WordPad
- Type: Word processor

Microsoft Write is a basic word processor included with Windows 1.0 and later, until Windows NT 3.51. Throughout its lifespan, it was minimally updated. "Microsoft Write" also shares the name of a commercial retail release of Microsoft Word for the Apple Macintosh and Atari ST which is otherwise separate from this program.

Early versions of Write only work with Write Document (.wri) files, which are a subset of the Rich Text Format (RTF). After Windows 3.0, Write became capable of reading and composing early Word Document (.doc) files. With Windows 3.1, Write became OLE capable. In Windows 95, Write was replaced with WordPad; attempting to open Write from the Windows folder will open WordPad instead. The executable for Microsoft Write (write.exe) still remains in later versions of Windows, however it is simply a compatibility stub that launches WordPad.

Being a word processor, Write features additional document formatting features that are not found in Notepad (a simple text editor), such as a choice of font, text decorations and paragraph indentation for different parts of the document. Unlike versions of WordPad before Windows 7, Write could justify a paragraph. Write is comparable to early versions of MacWrite.

== How to open Microsoft Write documents (.wri) ==
LibreOffice 5.1 and newer releases can open most versions of Microsoft Write documents (.wri). After opening a Write document it can then be saved in OpenDocument Format which is the default file format for LibreOffice or saved in another file format. LibreOffice is able to open most Microsoft Write documents by use of an import filter called libwps, this import filter is included with LibreOffice by default.

Microsoft applications cannot open Microsoft Write documents. Microsoft stopped shipping Write when Windows 95 was introduced in 1995. Write was replaced with Microsoft WordPad which a few years later stopped supporting all the Write document (.wri) formats; this occurred when Windows XP Service Pack 2 shipped in 2004.

== See also ==
- List of word processor programs
