= CMS Shared File System =

The CMS Shared File System (SFS) is a record-oriented file system for the IBM z/VM Conversational Monitor System (CMS).

SFS was introduced with VM/SP HPO release 6 in October, 1987, and provides a modern alternative to the traditional CMS file system, which continues to be supported

== Features ==
According to the announcement, SFS supports the following new features.

- File-level sharing, as opposed to traditional CMS minidisk sharing. Files are shared among multiple users based on authorizations granted by the creator of the file or an administrator.
- hierarchical directory support.
- Files can be shared among VM systems connected across a network.
- Application compatibility for most applications using the CMS File System.
- Allocation of space in a shared file system is allocated to individual users by authorization.
- Dynamic backout and system recovery.

== Internals ==
The main component of the Shared File System is the filepool, which contains "storage groups, a catalog, a control disk, and log disks. The control disk tracks usage of all data blocks in the filepool. The log disks record changes, to enable backout and recovery, The catalog (storage group 1) contains metadata: file names, permissions, and structure.

A file pool is a set of minidisks owned by a "file pool server" virtual machine. There is no defined limit to the number of file pool servers that can be active on a single system. All operations on objects in a file pool are done through requests to the server. The file pool contains storage allocated to one or more users, called a "file space". Storage in a file space is allocated in blocks 4 KB in size A file space can contain either SFS data or Byte File System (BFS) data, but not both.

The top directory in an SFS file space always is the user id of its owner. There may be a hierarchy of directories underneath this top directory.

== Commands ==
Existing CMS commands that operate on SMS files:

- RENAME
- QUERY
- LISTFILE
- FILELIST

New commands for SFS:

- CREATE creates empty files or directories
- GRANT sets permissions for files and directories
- REVOKE revokes permissions
- RELOCATE moves files from one directory to amother
- LISTDIR lists directories
- DIRLIST full screen interface
