= Storage record =

Term used in computer science for a group of related data treated as a meaningful unit

In computer science, a storage record is:

- A group of related data, words, or fields treated as a meaningful unit; for instance, a Name, Address, and Telephone Number can be a "Personal Record".
- A self-contained collection of information about a single object; a record is made up of a number of distinct items, called fields.

In record-oriented filesystems, a record is a basic unit of device-to-program data transfers. "A storage record is the direct result of transforming a logical record to an actual storage format." Files in record-oriented filesystems are structured collections of records. Records may have a fixed length or variable length.

In Unix-like systems, a number of programs (for example, awk, join, and sort) are designed to process data consisting of records (called lines) each separated by newlines, where each record may contain a number of fields separated by spaces, commas, or some other character.

== See also ==
- Block (data storage)
- Object composition
- Record (computer science)
- Row (database)
- User-defined type
