= Bare Bones Software =

Macintosh computer software developer

- Type: corporation
- Industry: Software industry
- Founded: June 1994; 32 years ago
- Headquarters: North Chelmsford, Massachusetts
- Products: Classic Mac OS & Mac OS X software
- Website: www.barebones.com

Bare Bones Software is a private North Chelmsford, Massachusetts, United States software company developing software tools for the Apple Macintosh platform. The company develops the BBEdit text editor, marketed under the registered trademark "It doesn't suck", and has been mentioned as a "top-tier Mac developer" by Mac OS X journalist John Siracusa.

The company was founded in May 1993, and incorporated under the Commonwealth of Massachusetts in June 1994.

== Product list ==
- BBEdit Professional HTML and Text Editor.
- Yojimbo Information Organizer.

Discontinued:

- BBEdit Lite Free "lightweight" Text Editor (replaced by TextWrangler).
- Mailsmith Email client (ownership transferred to Stickshift Software; became freeware).
- Super Get Info File and folder info utility for Mac OS X. (discontinued)
- TextWrangler Free, lightweight Text Editor which replaced BBEdit Lite (replaced by BBEdit).
- WeatherCal application that adds weather forecasts to iCal (discontinued on July 31, 2011).
