= TextEdit =

Open-source word processor and text editor

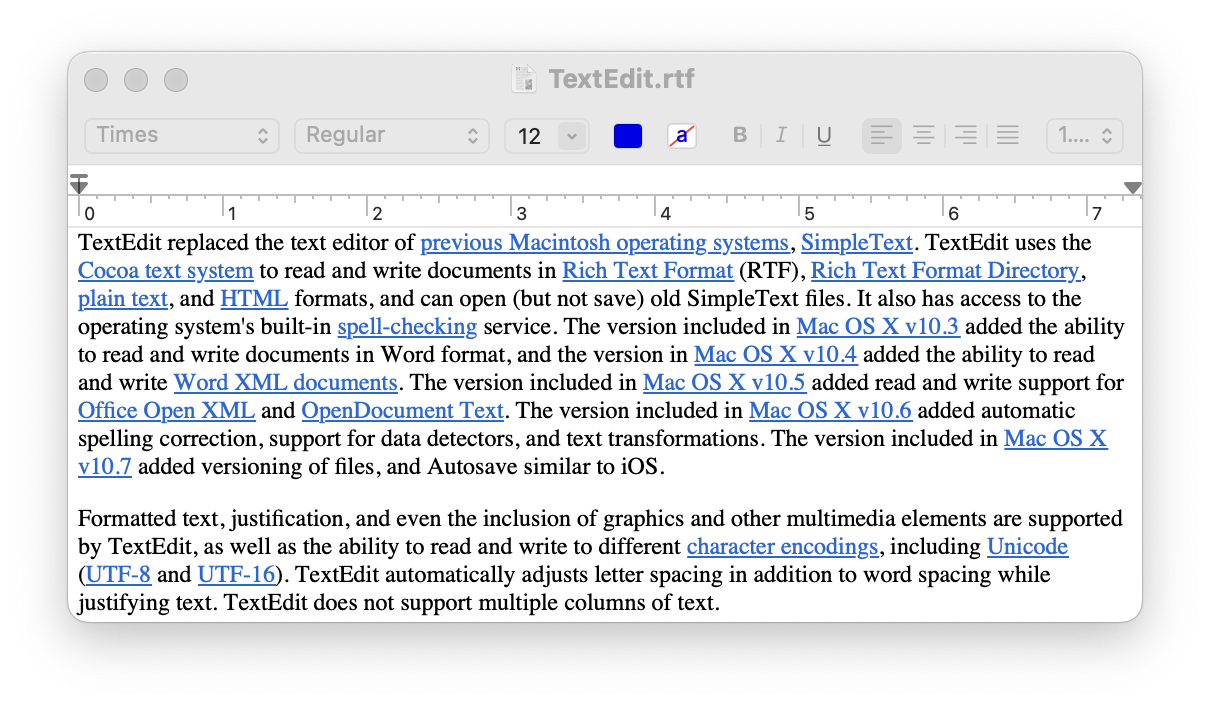
- Screenshot of TextEdit 1.19
- Developer: Apple
- Release: July 1996; 30 years ago with the release of OPENSTEP 4.0
- Stable release: 1.21 / 13 July 2026; 2 months ago
- Operating system: Originally released for NeXTSTEP, released for macOS after Apple's purchase of NeXT; Ported to all GNUstep systems (up to 1.6)
- Type: Text editor, word processor
- License: BSD-3-Clause
- Website: developer.apple.com/library/mac/samplecode/TextEdit

TextEdit is an open-source word processor and text editor, first featured in NeXT's NeXTSTEP and OPENSTEP. It is now distributed with macOS since Apple's acquisition of NeXT, and available as a GNUstep application for other Unix-like operating systems such as Linux. It is powered by Apple Advanced Typography.

== History ==
TextEdit was originally released as part of NeXT's OpenStep 4.0 release as a replacement for Edit. Developed to demonstrate the new text system, TextEdit was one of the "Demos" included as part of the OS, and credited Mike Ferris, Rick McGowan, and Ali Ozer.

== Implementation ==
TextEdit uses the Cocoa text system to read and write documents in Rich Text Format (RTF), Rich Text Format Directory, plain text, and HTML formats, and can open (but not save) old SimpleText files. It also has access to the operating system's built-in spell-checking service. The version included in Mac OS X v10.3 added the ability to read and write documents in Word format, and the version in Mac OS X v10.4 added the ability to read and write Word XML documents. The version included in Mac OS X v10.5 added read and write support for Office Open XML and OpenDocument Text. The version included in Mac OS X v10.6 added automatic spelling correction, support for data detectors, and text transformations. The version included in Mac OS X v10.7 added versioning of files, and Autosave similar to iOS.

Formatted text, justification, and even the inclusion of graphics and other multimedia elements are supported by TextEdit, as well as the ability to read and write to different character encodings, including Unicode (UTF-8 and UTF-16). TextEdit automatically adjusts letter spacing in addition to word spacing while justifying text. TextEdit does not support multiple columns of text.

The high-resolution TextEdit 1.5 icon found in Mac OS X versions starting with 10.5 (Leopard) features an extract from Apple's "Think different" ad campaign. This was replaced by a blank sheet of notebook paper in 10.10 (Yosemite).

== Source code ==
Apple formerly distributed TextEdit's source code as part of the documentation of its integrated development environment (IDE) Xcode. On the Internet, the source code of TextEdit can be found in Apple's Mac Developer Library. The following quote is from the characteristic part of the BSD-3-Clause-compliant license text included in the source code:

[...] In consideration of your agreement to abide by the following terms, and subject to these terms, Apple grants you a personal, non-exclusive license, under Apple's copyrights in this original Apple software (the "Apple Software"), to use, reproduce, modify and redistribute the Apple Software, with or without modifications, in source and/or binary forms; provided that if you redistribute the Apple Software in its entirety and without modifications, you must retain this notice and the following text and disclaimers in all such redistributions of the Apple Software. Neither the name, trademarks, service marks or logos of Apple Computer, Inc. may be used to endorse or promote products derived from the Apple Software without specific prior written permission from Apple. Except as expressly stated in this notice, no other rights or licenses, express or implied, are granted by Apple herein, including but not limited to any patent rights that may be infringed by your derivative works or by other works in which the Apple Software may be incorporated.[...]

== See also ==
- List of word processors
- Comparison of word processors
- Office Open XML software
- OpenDocument software
- TextEdit (API)
