= Rich Text Format Directory =

Document format

- Filename extension: .rtfd
- Uniform Type Identifier (UTI): com.apple.rtfd
- Type of format: Word processing document
- Container for: RTF and media files

Rich Text Format Directory, also known as RTFD (due to its extension .rtfd), or Rich Text Format with Attachments, is a primary document format of TextEdit, an application native to NeXTSTEP and macOS which has also been ported to other versions of Unix. The file format is based on the Rich Text Format, but can also include "attachments" such as images and animations.

An RTFD document is a bundle, a folder containing files. It contains a Rich Text file called TXT.rtf that contains Rich Text formatting commands, as well as commands for including images or other attachments contained within the bundle. Images used in the document are stored in the bundle in their native formats.

One advantage of RTFD is that it supports scalable high quality image formats like PDF, so an RTFD file can print with no information loss at large paper sizes. The standard RTF format also supports a number of scalable image meta file formats.

== Compatibility ==
=== macOS ===
Like RTF, RTFD files can be opened on macOS, which supports bundles. Mac applications that support RTF and RTFD include Apple's TextEdit and Pages, and a third-party free program called Bean. However, Microsoft's Office for Mac and most other document applications on the platform do not support RTFD.

=== Microsoft Windows ===
In contrast to RTF, RTFD files cannot be opened properly by applications on Windows, which does not support the concept of bundles.

In Microsoft Windows, RTFD files are displayed as folders. Editing these folders may destroy the data inside the RTFD. In particular editing any of the elements, such as the text file, inside the folder will remove other elements, such as graphics. Any text associated with the RTFD file appears in the Windows folder as an RTF file. However, when the RTF file is edited in a text editor such as WordPad, Notepad or Word, graphics elements are replaced by a text notation showing their inclusion and, when saved, the graphics elements inside the folder are 'lost' when the RTFD file is subsequently opened in macOS.

Note that, if the RTFD file is saved as an archive file (.zip, .rar etc.) it can also be "opened" on Windows using WinZip 8.1 as well as WinRar 3.7.1, meaning the user can extract the contents of the .rtfd file (.pdf, .rtf, .jpg, etc.) and then look at each extracted file using its native application (Acrobat, WordPad, Photo Gallery, etc.). However, as previously stated, some of the contents, such as graphics elements, will be lost after editing when the RTFD file is subsequently re-opened in macOS.

If RTFD is converted to WebArchive on a Mac by using the "Save As" function in TextEdit, it may be opened and viewed in the web browser Safari even in Windows.

=== Linux ===
In contrast to RTF, RTFD files generally cannot be opened properly by applications on operating systems which do not recognize the bundled data. Most applications and operating environments on Linux, like Windows, treat the bundle as a folder containing unstructured data files.

However, the applications written for the GNUstep environment, such as the Ink text editor, can open these documents and the GNUstep environment itself recognizes the concept of a bundle.
