= Zero-byte file =

Computer file containing no data

A zero-byte file, zero-length file, or empty file is a computer file containing no data. As the size (a.k.a. length) of a file is often measured in bytes, such a file has length of zero bytes.

Although there are many ways to create a zero-byte file, one common way to intentionally create one is via the touch command. The command line touch abc creates a zero-byte file named abc.

The creation of any file involves creating it with zero length, but usually data is written to a new file almost immediately after creation such that users don't generally notice files in a zero-byte state. The presence of a zero-byte file may indicate a failure of a program. One common scenario involves caching data in memory and then flushing to storage at a later time. A program that does not flush to storage (i.e. due to abnormal termination) may erroneously leave a zero-byte file. Sometimes, the time between file creation and writing data to it is long enough that a user does notice that the file has zero size before a program writes any content.

Even a zero-byte file requires storage space since every file has file system metadata. The file system may allocate a minimum size of space to every file. Such file system parameters may be discovered via an operating system utility such as stat. Often this size is 4096 bytes.

Some file formats include metadata (separate from file system metadata). In this case, a file that contains no content may have non-zero size. For example, a word processor document with no text, an image with zero-by-zero dimensions, or an audio sample of zero duration may contain metadata which makes the size of the file non-zero. On the other hand, some file formats have no metadata. For example, an ASCII text file has no metadata such that a file with no content has zero size. But, some text file formats do include a byte order mark header that describes the encoding – making a file with no content non-zero in size.

== Uses ==
A zero-byte file is sometimes used for intentional purposes. For example, a user might find a zero-byte file named documents-moved-to-partition-D in an otherwise empty directory and then know to look in partition D for the files that used to be in that directory. Sometimes, a zero-byte file is added to a directory to ensure that it is not empty since some tools (such as backup and revision control software) ignore an empty directory.

The presence or absence of a file with a particular name can be used to direct program control flow. For example:

IF EXIST C:\NOTHING.TXT EXIT
IF NOT EXIST C:\NOTHING.TXT GOTO START
:START
REM Create the zero-length file
C:\>type null>nothing.txt
:EXIT

== Bibliography ==
- Mathai, Anith (2019). "Zero-byte files. A big problem in eDiscovery. What are they, and is there anything you can do about them?". www.linkedin.com.
