= Enriched text =

Formatted text format for e-mail

- Internet media type: text/enriched
- Type of format: Formatted text format
- Standard: RFC 1896 Enriched Text

Enriched text was an unofficial formatted text format for email, defined by the IETF in RFC 1896 and associated with the text/enriched MIME type which is defined in RFC 1563.

It never saw widespread use and was never intended to:

This document is only a minor revision to the text/enriched MIME type that was first described in [RFC-1523] and [RFC-1563], and is only intended to be used in the short term until other MIME types for text formatting in Internet mail are developed and deployed.

It is fully expected that other text formatting standards like HTML and SGML will supplant text/enriched in Internet mail.

== Format ==
A predecessor of this MIME type was called text/richtext in RFC 1341 and RFC 1521. Neither should be confused with Rich Text Format (RTF, MIME type text/rtf or application/rtf), which is an unrelated specification, devised by Microsoft.

A single newline in enriched text is treated as a space. Formatting commands are in the same style as SGML and HTML. They must be balanced and nested.

Enriched text is a supported format of Emacs, Evolution, Mutt, Mulberry and Netscape Communicator.

== Examples ==
<bold>Hello, <italic>world!</italic></bold>

Output:

Hello, world!

<color><param>red</param>Blood</color> is <bold>thicker</bold> than
<color><param>blue</param>water</color>.

<paraindent><param>left</param><italic>-- Well-known proverb
</italic></paraindent>

Output:

Blood is thicker than water.

-- Well-known proverb
