= Output padding =

Non-printing characters used after control operations

In computing, output padding is the insertion of non-printing characters into the device output stream to allow for a preceding control operation to take effect.

Output padding was necessary on many printing devices, notably Teletype and other mechanical terminals, after the issuance of a carriage return. Without the padding, following characters might print in the middle of the output line.

Output padding was also necessary on many display terminals after cursor positioning, scrolling, and other commands.

Typically the null character was used; the delete character was occasionally used. The number of padding characters depended on the particular device, but also sometimes on the horizontal position of the printing carriage.
