= Yojimbo (software) =

- Yojimbo's example library and quick reference tab
- Developer: Bare Bones Software
- Stable release: 4.6.2 / March 11, 2021; 5 years ago
- Operating system: MacOS 10.13.6 or later
- Type: personal information manager
- Website: www.barebones.com/products/yojimbo/

Yojimbo is a personal information manager, or "snippet-keeper", for MacOS by Bare Bones Software. It can store notes, images and media, URLs, web pages, and passwords. Yojimbo can also encrypt any of its contents and store the password in the Keychain. It is Bare Bones' second Cocoa application.

Yojimbo can store almost any type of file. Users can "throw" as much information into the software as they want. One can tag items or organize them into folders. Yojimbo can organize files by file type; for example, all of the .docx and .pdf files are automatically sorted into a "Documents" folder, and all the .jpg or .svg files are put into an "Images" folder.

== History ==
Yojimbo was first released on January 23, 2006. At the time, Bare Bones called it "a completely new information organizer". The current list of versions released by Bare Bones are:

- Yojimbo 1.1
- Yojimbo 1.3
- Yojimbo 1.5
- Yojimbo 2.0
- Yojimbo 2.1
- Yojimbo 2.2
- Yojimbo 3 and new iPad version
- Yojimbo 4
- Yojimbo 4.5

In 2007, another developer, Adrian Ross, created Webjimbo, a web interface through which users can access their Yojimbo libraries.

Like other developers, Bare Bones Software faced difficulties adding iCloud sync due to early limitations in Apple's service. Tech reporter Christophe Laporte criticized Yojimbo's transition to iCloud as bungled, and expressed frustration at the lack of updates to the app.

Security researchers have published one CVE(Common Vulnerabilities and Exposures) for Yojimbo.
