= TextEdit (API) =

TextEdit was the name of a collection of application programming interfaces (APIs) in the classic Mac OS for performing text editing.

These APIs provided a common text handling system to support text entry fields in dialog boxes and other simple text editing within the Macintosh GUI. Over time, they were extended to provide more advanced text editing features, but its limited initial scope proved to be a fundamental limitation. Apple repeatedly stated that TextEdit was not a word processor, and therefore providing rich text editing was always left to third-party developers.

== Limitations ==
Limitations of TextEdit include:

- only supported 8-bit character sets.
- 16-bit internal indexing limited text to 32k characters.
- use of QuickDraw for glyph rendering limited the maximum height of a text block to 32k pixels - this could be encountered before the character limit was hit with larger font sizes.

The first incarnation of TextEdit supported a single style of text, which applied to all text in a block. This was more than adequate for its intended use, supporting text entry fields. Later, support was added for styled text so that TextEdit could be used for more complex text editing tasks, such as text editing areas in web browsers, etc.

TextEdit is part of the Carbon API on macOS, but has been superseded by numerous other solutions including ATSUI in Carbon, the third party WASTE text engine, as well as NSText and related classes within Cocoa.
