= File viewer =

Application form for viewing computer file contents

A file viewer is a utility application software on operating systems, such as Linux, macOS, or Windows. The file viewer is responsible for user access of files located on a data storage device. File viewers allow the user to open and view content on a device, such as a Personal Computer (PC) or a mobile phone.

== Overview ==
File viewer applications can be categorized based on their functionality:

- File Viewer Only applications do not allow the user to edit files.
- File Viewer and Converter applications allow viewing data, exporting data in a different file format, and copying information to the clipboard.
- File Viewer and Editor applications allow the user to view existing files, modify an existing file's content, or create a new file of a specific type.

Differences in functionality are often due to software licensing and proprietary file formats. Some formats can be freely viewed but require specific software for creation or modification. For example, .DBF files created in dBASE could be viewed in Norton Commander, while .PDF files require software like Adobe Photoshop, LibreOffice, or Microsoft Word for editing, whereas Acrobat Reader supports only viewing.

To function correctly, a file viewer must interpret the structural information of a file format, such as byte order, character encoding, and newline styles. Media file viewers, such as video players, often rely on codecs rather than built-in format support. This approach allows users to extend a media viewer’s compatibility with additional file types.

Some editors, such as Audacity, allow users to open files as raw data, a feature sometimes used in glitch art. Additionally, some file viewers act as filters that convert binary files into text (e.g., antiword), though this may result in data loss.

Image viewers display graphic files on screen. Some viewers, such as IrfanView, can read multiple graphic file formats, while others, such as JPEGview only support a single format. Common image viewer features include thumbnail preview and creation, image zooming and rotation, color balance and gamma correction, resizing, etc.

Popular system-wide file viewers directly integrated into the shell of an operating system have been Quick View (included in Windows 9x) and Quick Look (included in MacOS starting since Mac OS X Leopard).

A web browser functions as a file viewer for HTML and various other file types. While HTML files are stored as plain text, web browsers render them into a structured, human-readable format. Additionally, web browsers can display multimedia files, including images, videos, preformatted documents, and interactive content such as 3D models, augmented reality and virtual reality elements.

== Examples of File Viewers ==
=== Plain text files ===
- Less (Unix)
- gedit (Unix)
- Most (Unix)
- pg (Unix)
- More (command)
- vi
- notepad

=== Microsoft Office documents ===
- Microsoft Word Viewer
- Microsoft Excel Viewer
- PowerPoint Viewer

=== PDF files ===
- Adobe Acrobat
- Atril
- Evince
- PDF.js
- see Category:PDF readers

=== Image files ===
- Directory Opus
- IrfanView
- ACDSee
- XnView

=== Video and audio files ===
- Media Player Classic
- Windows Media Player
- VLC

=== Binary files ===
- Hiew
- UltraEdit
- Midnight Commander
- ExifTool

=== Programming languages source code files ===
- Notepad++
- VS Code

=== VRML and 3D models files ===
- VRML Viewer
- FreeWRL
- view3dscene
- Microsoft 3D viewer

=== Microsoft Project plan files ===
- Microsoft Project
- Seavus Project Viewer (software)

== See also ==
- Binary file#Viewing binary files
- Electronic document
- Image viewer
- Media player
- Text editor
- Web browser
- Terminal pager
