= TLDR Pages =

Simplified and community-driven man pages

tldr-pages

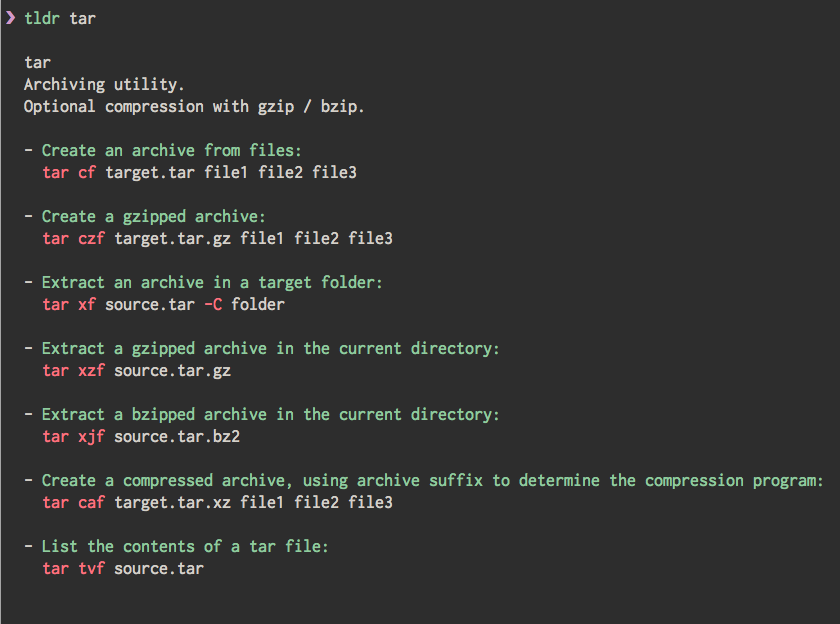
- Screenshot of a CLI client for tldr-pages
- Original author: Romain Prieto
- Release: December 8, 2013; 12 years ago
- Written in: Markdown
- Platform: Multiplatform
- Available in: German, Spanish, Persian, French, Indonesian, Italian, Japanese, Korean, Malayalam, Dutch, Norwegian, Portuguese, Russian, Swedish, Slovene, Hindi, Tamil, Thai, Turkish, Chinese, Ukrainian, Arabic, Bengali, Bosnian, Catalan, Persian, Polish
- Type: Software documentation
- License: CC BY-SA 4.0; MIT License
- Website: tldr.sh
- Repository: github.com/tldr-pages/tldr

TLDR Pages (stylized as tldr-pages) is a free and open-source collaborative software documentation project that aims to be a simpler, more approachable complement to traditional man pages. It's a collection of community-maintained help pages that cover command-line utilities and other computer programs. A page can be invoked by issuing the tldr command. The name comes from the word TL;DR, which is an abbreviation for "too long; didn't read", referring to man pages that are said to be too long by several users.

As of September 2026, its repository on GitHub has more than 63,500 stars and 5,400 forks.

== History ==
Romain Prieto started the project by making the first commit on the popular code hosting and version control site GitHub, on 8 December 2013 at 19:56:16 according to the timezone of his personal computer.

At first, only a handful of people were contributing to the project. By the end of 2015, with the help of unknown Chinese publications promoting it, the project has seen a rapid amount of growth in popularity on GitHub, leaving popular software and programming languages like Swift behind. On 25 December 2015, the project ended up trending at 3rd place. By 27 December 2015, the repository had reached 2700+ stars, having gained approximately 700 of it only in a week. On the following day, the project reached the front page of Hacker News. After the post, the amount of stars received by the project reached to 3700+ and the project itself arrived at #1 in daily popularity within the day. The project had seen another bump in late 2017 and later kept a stable increase of popularity to this day.

== Formatting ==
The default formatting usage of tldr-pages is Markdown, a popular markup language used in many other free software and documentation projects.

While the project has its own custom {{token_syntax}} extension, it adheres to CommonMark specification. In fact the project specifications require that clients are fully compatible with CommonMark.

== Command usage ==
Get typical usages of a command:

tldr command

To see what can be done, a reasonably nice command would be:

tldr tldr

Show the tar TLDR page for Linux:

tldr -p linux tar

Get help for a Git subcommand:

tldr git-checkout

Update local pages (if the client supports caching):

tldr -u

== Authoring ==
TLDR Pages can be written in any text editor that supports CommonMark formatting.

To make a contribution to the tldr-pages repository on GitHub, you need to sign the Contributor License Agreement and follow the project's guidelines, which are said to be not strict rules but auxiliary information to keep the simple nature of the pages.

== Licensing ==
The pages are licensed under the Creative Commons Attribution 4.0 International License, while the contents of the scripts/ directory are licensed under MIT License. Any contributions to the project are governed under the Contributor License Agreement.

== See also ==
- List of Unix commands
- Man page
- info
- apropos
- Collaborative innovation network
