= Apropos =

Apropos or À Propos may refer to:

- apropos (Unix), a program used to search for program manual pages
- A rootkit created by 121Media to install adware
- À Propos, a Canadian radio program
