= Air Sharing =

File sharing and document viewing application

- Developers: Avatron Software, Inc.
- Stable release: 3.1 / May 18, 2012; 13 years ago
- Operating system: iOS
- Platform: ARM: iPhone, iPod Touch, iPad
- Available in: English, Simplified Chinese, Traditional Chinese, Dutch, French, German, Italian, Japanese, Korean, Norwegian, Portuguese, Russian, Spanish
- Type: File sharing, file viewer
- License: Commercial
- Website: avatron.com/apps/air-sharing

Air Sharing was a file sharing and document viewing application for the operating system iOS. The application let users mount the device hard drive over wireless internet to a computer and drag and drop files. Users could also view files and manage files on the iPhone in many popular formats. On loading the application on the iPhone, iPod touch, or iPad, a view showed files saved in the software. An icon on the bottom showed an IP Address and Apple Bonjour address. On entering one of these into the address bar of a Web browser a simple HTML based interface was shown, where files could be downloaded and uploaded. Air Sharing could also be mapped as a network drive using WebDAV.

In 2008, Air Sharing received the "Editor's Choice Award" from PCMag.com and the "Most Useful App" award from Macworld.com.
