= CAT (phototypesetter) =

Computer-controlled phototypesetter

The GSI C/A/T (Computer Assisted Typesetter) is a phototypesetter developed by Graphic Systems in 1972. This phototypesetter, along with troff software for UNIX, revolutionized the typesetting and document printing industry. Phototypesetting is most often used with offset printing technology.

The GSI C/A/T phototypesetter was marketed by Singer Corporation in 1974 before the company was purchased by Wang Laboratories in 1978.

Graphic Systems designed a simple computer front end to print basic text as display type. Full-scale page-composition computing was designed at Bell Laboratories as part of the UNIX project.

== Features ==
The C/A/T phototypesetter features:

- Punched paper tape for document input
- Four font film strips with 102 characters or glyphs per strip
- Canisters of photographic paper or film to receive the image
- Fifteen distinct font sizes (5 pt to 72 pt)
- Horizontal positioning precision of 432 units per inch
- Vertical positioning precision of 144 units per inch

C/A/T optics consist of a rotating wheel, to which are attached film strips of master font characters. The wheel's periphery has four such replaceable font film strip sections. A xenon strobe inside the wheel is programmed to flash the characters from the font films through magnification optics to a fiber-optic bundle. The programmable location of the fiber-optic bundle determines the horizontal position of the character image on a scroll of photographic paper or film.

C/A/T is a highly addressable phototypesetter with full optics control from computer-generated data. This precise control of optics and image position made the interface to computer programs reasonably simple. Data is normally transmitted to the C/A/T by paper tape. Some companies created electronic replacements for the paper-tape interface to accommodate direct connection to computer systems. C/A/T has no page layout and pagination capability. It is only a high-resolution printer that puts high-resolution character images onto a photographic medium. Page layout is determined by the typesetting software used to generate the paper tape.

== Timeline ==
- 1971, Graphic Systems designs and markets the C/A/T phototypesetter.
- 1972, Graphic Systems provides a simple computer front end to handle display typesetting from text input using a standard set of fonts.
- 1973, Bell Laboratories purchases a GSI C/A/T phototypesetter for their UNIX software development team.
- 1973, The troff software was created by Joe F. Ossanna at Bell Labs.
- 1974, Graphic Systems partners with Singer Corporation to market the GSI C/A/T phototypesetter. Singer Corporation was allowed to put the Singer C/A/T logo on equipment they sold.
- 1978, Singer Corporation gets out of the typesetting business.
- 1978, Wang Laboratories purchases Graphic Systems and continues to market the GSI C/A/T typesetter for UNIX-based phototypesetting. The phototypesetter was then known as the Wang Graphic Systems C/A/T. This allowed the phototypesetter to be available through the 1980s.
- 1979, ditroff software was created by Brian Kernighan.
- 1979, TeX software was created by Donald E. Knuth.
- 1981–1983, LaTeX software was created by Leslie Lamport.
- 1992, Wang Laboratories declared Chapter 11 bankruptcy.

== History ==
Bell Labs purchased a C/A/T phototypesetter in 1973 for their engineers who were developing the UNIX operating system. C/A/T became the de facto standard for UNIX-based typesetting. The early typesetting programs on general-purpose computers displaced special-purpose photocomposition systems.

Noteworthy typesetting software created for C/A/T includes troff (1973), which was developed by Joe F. Ossanna at Bell Labs. Brian Kernighan later developed ditroff (typesetter independent troff), which supported the C/A/T and other publishing systems. C/A/T was the workhorse of UNIX printing through the 1980s for shops that could not afford hot lead typography equipment or expensive and proprietary document typesetting systems. High-resolution laser printing, now common in desktop publishing, was not yet available.

Graphic Systems did not have the marketing capability to dominate the phototypesetting business. Singer Manufacturing Company around 1975 acquired the rights to market the hardware, including placing the Singer C/A/T logo on the products. Singer continued to support C/A/T systems until 1979. Wang Laboratories bought Graphic Systems in 1978. The phototypesetter was then known as Wang Graphic Systems C/A/T with continued support through the 1980s.

Advances in electronic typesetting programs such as ditroff (1979), TeX (1979), and LaTeX (1981–1983) obsoleted the C/A/T phototypesetter. C/A/T continued to be prevalent in many UNIX-based documentation shops until high-quality laser printers became prevalent.

== Singer Corporation Typesetting ==
Others had noticed the sudden growth in the typesetting equipment market. One was Singer Corp. which set up a national sales force for typesetting and graphic arts equipment, including the phototypesetting machines made by another Massachusetts company, Graphic Systems Inc. These machines had a brief but spectacular run in the 1970s until someone at Singer asked what they were doing in the typesetting equipment business (which they knew nothing about), so little GSI was left to its own devices with no marketing organization. Singer had been responsible for providing the type font masters and the machines were getting a reputation for poor base line regularity. This may have been a hardware problem because strobe timing errors showed up as base line errors on the GSI machines, while on the Mergenthaler VIP such errors showed up between the characters, and unless fairly serious, escaped notice. GSI began producing excellent font masters and the machines continued to find a market. They built a minicomputer into the machine (a Nova), making it capable of setting justified, hyphenated type from a pure text input using a particularly convenient coding system that owed nothing to old Linotype practices. It allowed stored formats, or in-line codes. These machines held four fonts at a time, but had more characters per font than the VIP, so that the asterisks and other common characters were included. They used a rotating turret of lenses and a second "doubler lens" to offer a range of sizes from 5 to 72 points. The GSI machines were particularly popular with the in-house typesetting departments that began to grow in most larger companies.

— Clark E. Coffee, Old Phototypesetter Tales

== Standard error ==
The output stream standard error (stderr), a standard on many systems for over 40 years, was first created because of this device. Initially, error messages from typesetting software were also sent to the typesetter, wasting time and materials. This prompted the creation of a separate output channel for error messages.
