= Most (Unix) =

most
- Original author: John E. Davis
- Developers: Mats Akerberg, Henk D. Davids, Rex O. Livingston, Mark Pizzolato, Robert Mills
- Initial release: before February 22, 2005; 20 years ago (version 4.10.1)
- Stable release: 5.2.0 / 4 August 2022; 3 years ago
- Repository: https://github.com/jedsoft/most
- Operating system: Cross-platform
- Type: system utility
- License: GPL-2.0-or-later
- Website: jedsoft.org/most/

most is a program on Unix, OpenVMS, MS-DOS, Windows and Unix-like systems used to view (but not change) the contents of a text file one screen at a time. Programs of this sort are called pagers. It is similar to more, but has the extended capability of allowing both forward and backward navigation through the file, and can scroll left and right. most also supports multiple windows.

Mats Akerberg, Henk D. Davids, Rex O. Livingston, and Mark Pizzolato contributed to early VMS versions of most. Mark Pizzolato worked on it to get it ready for DECUS. Robert Mills re-wrote the search routines to use regular expressions.

== See also ==
- pg (Unix)
- more (command)
- less (Unix)
