= ManOpen =

- ManOpen showing the openman man page.
- Developer(s): Carl Lindberg
- Stable release: 2.6 / March 2012
- Operating system: Mac OS X, OPENSTEP/Mach-O
- Type: Graphical man page viewer
- License: BSD-2-Clause
- Website: www.clindberg.org/projects/ManOpen.html

ManOpen is a utility for NeXTSTEP and Mac OS X created by Carl Lindberg that can display Unix man pages in a graphical environment instead of a terminal emulator such as Terminal.

Man pages are included in the program; it has a Recents menu, where users can view recently opened man pages, a Section selector to jump to a section of the manual, and a Find function that can search for text in the manual. Included with the application is a command line utility called openman that will open invoked man pages in ManOpen. Internally ManOpen does not directly view the man page but runs it though Harald Schlangmann's cat2html or cat2rtf into HTML or RTF for viewing.

In their Mac OS X Version 10.1 Black Book, author Mark R. Bell and system administrator Debrah D. Suggs commented positively on ManOpen usefulness, and described it as "a great utility".
