= Quick View =

Windows file viewer software

- Quick View on Windows 98
- Operating system: Microsoft Windows
- Type: File viewer

Quick View is a file viewer in Windows 95, Windows 98 and Windows NT 4.0 operating systems. The viewer can be used to view practically any file.

The software has been ported by third parties to support XP, Vista and 7.

On 1995-04-03, InfoSoft International, Inc., announced the acquisition of Systems Compatibility Corporation, and the renaming of InfoSoft International, Inc. to Inso Corporation. Inso Corporation later developed Quick View Plus products.

== Quick View Plus ==
Quick View Plus
- Original author(s): Inso Corporation (4-5.11); JASC (end user version, 5-7); Corel Corporation (7); IntraNet Solutions, Inc. (1000+ license version); Stellent, Inc. (Pocket PC, 8); Avantstar, Inc. (8-current)
- Developer(s): IntraNet Solutions, Inc. (6) (WinCE); Inso Corporation (4-6) (WinCE); Stellent, Inc. (6-8) (WinCE); Avantstar, Inc. (7-current)
- Operating system: Windows 3.1 (-4.5); Windows NT 4.0 (4.0-8); Windows 95 (4-8); Windows 98 (5-8); Windows Me (?-8); Windows 2000 (8-11); Windows XP (8-); Windows Vista (10-); Windows 7 (11-); Windows 8 (13-); Windows CE
- License: Trialware
- Website: quickviewplus.com

Quick View Plus is a commercial variant based on Inso Corporation (later IntraNet Solutions, Inc., Stellent Inc., Oracle)'s Outside In technology.

The Windows 3.1 version of the product was originally named Outside In for Windows 3.1 before it was renamed to Quick View Plus for Windows 3.1. The Outside In name was reused as the viewer engine for Quick View Plus products.

The distributor was later changed to Avantstar, Inc., founded by Stellent's close associates in 2001.

=== Quick View Plus for UNIX ===
It is a version of Inso Corporation QVP supporting Sun Solaris for SPARC, HP-UX, IBM AIX.

=== Quick View Plus for Windows CE ===
It is a product for Windows CE, including Pocket PC 2002.

=== Version history ===
==== Quick View Plus for Windows 95 ====
It was released on 1995-09-30.

Microsoft Word file viewer Plug-in for Netscape Navigator 2.0 was released on 1996-02-07.

==== 4.0 ====
It was released on 1996-11-11.

New file formats include: WordPerfect 7, Quattro Pro 7, Freelance 96 for Windows 95, Novell PerfectWorks 2.0, Corel Presentations, LZH archive.

It supports integration with:

- Microsoft Internet Explorer 3.0
- Netscape Navigator 2.0 and higher
- Microsoft Exchange
- Lotus Notes 4.0

New operating system support include Windows 95, Windows NT 4.0.

Microsoft Office 97 module was released on 1997-06-04, which allows viewing and printing Microsoft Office 97 documents (Word 97, Excel 97).

==== 4.5 ====
It was released on 1997-08-13.

New file formats include: Microsoft Word 97 and Excel 97, Lotus 1-2-3 97, Freelance 97, Portable Network Graphics

New file formats for Netscape Navigator plug-in include Adobe Acrobat, Apple QuickTime, AVI Player, Corel CMX, Shockwave Director, Softsource DWG.

New application integrations include Microsoft Outlook 97, Eudora for Windows 95 and NT 4.0, and Internet Explorer 3.0 for Windows 3.1. Also if you are running on Magento than it good to use extension like Magento 2 Quick View.

==== 5.0 ====
It was released in 1998.

New and improved integration includes support for Outlook 98, Outlook Express, Internet Explorer, Microsoft Exchange, Netscape Navigator, Netscape Communicator 5, Eudora 4, America Online, Lotus Notes, Lotus cc:Mail 8.1, Norton Navigator, and Spry Mosaic. Support for additional file formats include Microsoft PowerPoint 97 files, Lotus Word Pro 96 and 97, and RTF 1.5.

==== 5.1 ====
File format support was increased to over 200.

==== 5.11 ====
File format support was increased to over 225.

==== 6.0 ====
Quick View Plus Enterprise Edition was released on 2000-06-07.

New features include:

- QuickCompress: QuickView Plus can now compress any combination of files and folders, allowing you to create new ZIP files or add to existing ZIP archive files
- Auto Zip Email attachments: QuickView Plus can now be configured to automatically compress files overs a specified size when sending attachments via Microsoft Exchange, Microsoft Outlook or Lotus Notes
- New file navigation pane: QuickView Plus now provides an explorer-like navigation interface. It emulates your directory structure and allows to quickly see the contents of folders by merely scrolling through a display of individual files. For zip files, an additional pane displays the list of files in archive, with a view of each individual file displayed in a separate pane
- New software integration: Adobe Acrobat 4.x Reader, Lotus Notes 5, Microsoft Internet Explorer 5, Microsoft Outlook 2000, Microsoft Outlook Express 5.0, Netscape Communicator 4.5/4.6/4.7
- New format support: Adobe PhotoShop 4 (PSD), AutoCAD (DXF versions 12, 13, 14), Corel Draw (Versions 6-8), Corel Perfect Office 2000, Just Systems Ichitaro (versions 5 and 6), Kodak FlashPix, Micrografx Designer, Microsoft Office 2000 (Word, Excel, PowerPoint), Microsoft Project (text view), Outlook Message (MSG), Progressive JPEG, Microsoft Visio (preview)

==== 8.0 ====
Quick View Plus 8 was released on 2004-01-26.

- New software integration: AOL browser versions 7-9, CC:Mail 8.5, Eudora Pro 6, Lotus Notes Client R6, Microsoft Outlook Express 6, Microsoft Outlook 2003, Netscape 7
- New format support: Microsoft Office 2003 (Word, PowerPoint and Excel), Corel WordPerfect Office 11 (WordPerfect, Presentations and QuattroPro), Microsoft Project Files (2000, 2002 - text view only), AutoCAD files (2.5 through 2002)
- Enhanced Features: Enhanced file navigator, ability to print full path name on documents, enhanced viewing and printing options for spreadsheet files

==== 9.0 ====
Minimum operating system was changed to Windows 2000.

New format support:

- native PDF
- Adobe Acrobat 7
- Microsoft Visio 2003
- Microsoft Project 2003 (text only)
- Microsoft Word 2004 (Mac)
- Microsoft Excel 2004 (Mac)
- Microsoft PowerPoint 2004 (Mac)
- Corel WordPerfect 12
- Corel QuattroPro 12
- Corel Presentations 12
- Star Office Writer 6.x, 7.x, and 8 (text only)
- Star Office Impress 6.x, 7.x and 8
- Star Office Calc 6.x, 7.x and 8 (text only)
- XML (extracts text – ignores tags, attributes and values)
- OpenOffice Writer 1.1 and 2 (text only)
- OpenOffice Impress 1.1 and 2 (text only)
- OpenOffice Calc 1.1 and 2 (text only)
- Yahoo! Instant Messenger archive support
- Hangul 2002
- Ichitaro 11, 12, 13 and 2004

New software integration:

- Microsoft Outlook 2007
- Adobe Acrobat 7
- Internet Explorer 7
- Mozilla Firefox 1.5
- Lotus Notes 6.5 and 7
- Netscape 8.1
- Eudora Mail 7.0

Quick View Plus 9 Enhanced Features

- Improved response time viewing attachments within Microsoft Outlook
- Continuous section breaks in MS Word files
- Bi-Di text (Arabic/Hebrew) improvements
- Anti-aliasing for improved graphics view
- PowerPoint bullets support

==== 10.0 ====
It was released on 2008-08-05.

- New format support: Microsoft Office 2007 (Word, Excel and PowerPoint), Corel WordPerfect X3, Corel QuattroPro X3, Corel Presentations X3, OpenOffice Writer 2, StarOffice Writer 8, OpenOffice Impress 2, StarOffice Impress 8, .MSG and .PST.
- New software integration: Mozilla Firefox 2, Adobe Acrobat Reader 8.

New supported operating system includes Windows Vista.

==== 11.0 ====
Standard Edition was released on 2010-08-09. It adds support for following products:

- Microsoft Windows 7 (32-bit version)
- Microsoft Office 2010 file formats (including Word, Excel and PowerPoint)
- New and expanded file format support including Microsoft Office 2008 for Mac (including Word, Excel and PowerPoint), IBM Lotus Symphony 1.2, Lotus Notes DXL, PDF 1.7, AutoCAD 2005, 2006 and 2007 (with limitations); RAR and JAR files
- Ability to view .PST and .OST files over 2GB;
- Support for Microsoft Office 2007 charts
- Adobe Acrobat 9
- Microsoft Internet Explorer 8 and Mozilla Firefox 3.5

New Windows and Microsoft Outlook integration include:

- Ability to view files directly in the Preview Pane within Windows Explorer for Microsoft Windows 7 and Vista users.
- Direct viewing of attachments within Microsoft Outlook 2007.

Professional Edition was released on 2010-08-09. It adds with third-party program integration, metadata view, auto search, Microsoft Project Gantt chart support over standard edition.

64-bit versions were released on 2011-03-08. It supports 64-bit versions of Microsoft Windows 7, Microsoft Internet Explorer, and Microsoft Outlook 2010.

==== 12.0 ====
Standard Edition was released on 2012-01-30. It adds support for viewing and printing of 32 file formats including:

- Adobe PDF (Package and Portfolio)
- AutoCAD (2010, 2009 and 2008)
- Corel WordPerfect X4
- Open Office 3

Professional Edition was released on 2012-01-30, which adds following to Standard Edition:

- Viewing file metadata
- Working with highlighted searching
- Using Auto Search
- Viewing Microsoft Project Gantt chart
- Viewing tracked changes in Microsoft Word documents
- Viewing hidden rows, columns, and cells in spreadsheets
- Viewing speakers notes in Microsoft PowerPoint files
- Running Quick View Plus from a command line

==== 13.0 ====
Standard Edition and Professional Edition were released on 2013-08-20.

Changes to both versions of Quick View Plus 12 include:

- Support for Windows 8 (64- and 32-bit), Microsoft Outlook 2013, Microsoft Internet Explorer 10, Adobe Acrobat XI
- Enhanced Persistence of Zoom Option
- 21 new file format support for total of over 300 (Adobe Acrobat X (PDF 1.7), Apple iWork 09 Keynote/Numbers/Pages, AutoCAD 2010 and 2012, Corel Presentations X5, Corel QuattroPro X5, Corel WordPerfect X5, Hangul 2010, Illustrator CS5 and CS6, Lotus SmartSuite 9.8 1-2-3+, Lotus SmartSuite 9.8 WordPro+, Lotus SmartSuite Freelance+, Microsoft Access 95-2000, Microsoft Excel 2013, Microsoft Office 2003 XML (text only), Microsoft OneNote 2007-2010 (text only), Microsoft PowerPoint 2013, Microsoft Word 2013, Photoshop CS5 and CS6, SVG (XML display only. Content will be rendered as an XML file, not a multimedia file.))
- Enhanced file format support:

- Microsoft Outlook 2010: Now includes support for high encryption versions of .PST files.
- RTF messages: Embedded HTML in RTF messages now renders more closely to the original file.
- MSG and EML with digital signature: Digitally signed MSG and EML files are viewed in the same manner as unsigned MSG and EML files. Unencrypted, uncompressed opaque and clear signatures are supported. Self-signing is not supported.
- Microsoft Project: Notes fields viewable within Microsoft Project
- PDF: Enhanced font display for PDF documents

- Product integrations: Adobe Acrobat Reader 5-XI, Corel WordPerfect Suite 9 and 10, Google Chrome, Lotus cc:Mail 8.5, Lotus Notes 6.5.x and 7.0, Microsoft Internet Explorer 5.5-10, Microsoft Outlook 2000/2002/2003/2007/2010/2013, Microsoft Outlook Express 5.0/5.5/6.0, Mozilla Firefox Browser 3.5-22, Windows Explorer

Changes to Professional Edition include:

- View hidden text in Microsoft Word documents
- View hidden text in PowerPoint presentations. Display comments in PowerPoint on a per slide basis in a separate pane to the right of the main view window.
- Replace Generated Fields in Microsoft Word
- Ability to bulk configure options during deployment
- Configure MIME types. A network administrator can configure additional MIME types to be handled by the browser integrations in Quick View Plus or remove the ones that are configured by default via a deployment script.

Professional Edition adds following to Standard Edition:

- Use in conjunction with 3rd party applications
- Microsoft Project Gantt chart support
- Running Quick View Plus from a command line
- Viewing file metadata
- Using Auto Search
- Viewing tracked changes and hidden text in Microsoft Word documents
- Viewing speakers notes and Comments in Microsoft PowerPoint presentations
- Viewing cells in spreadsheets

==== 2017 ====
On July 18, 2017, Quick View Plus 2017 was released.

=== Quick View Plus Web ===
On Sept. 1, 2015, the web-based edition exploiting HTML5 of Quick View Plus - Quick View Plus Web was introduced at the International Legal Technology Association (ILTA) Conference. It integrates easily with eDiscovery and review platforms.

== See also ==
- Windows Picture and Fax Viewer
- Comparison of image viewers
