= Troff =

Typesetting language

troff
- Original author: Joe Ossanna
- Developer: AT&T Bell Laboratories
- Written in: C
- Operating system: Unix, Unix-like, Plan 9
- Platform: Cross-platform
- Type: Command
- License: Plan 9: MIT License
- Website: troff.org

troff (/ˈtiːrɒf/), short for "typesetter roff", is the major component of a document processing system developed by Bell Labs for the Unix operating system. troff and the related nroff were both developed from the original roff.

While nroff was intended to produce output on terminals and line printers, troff was intended to produce output on typesetting systems, specifically the Graphic Systems CAT, which had been introduced in 1972. Both used the same underlying markup language, and a single source file could normally be used by nroff or troff without change.

troff features commands to designate fonts, spacing, paragraphs, margins, footnotes and more. Unlike many other text formatters, troff can position characters arbitrarily on a page, even overlapping them, and has a fully programmable input language. Separate preprocessors are used for more convenient production of tables, diagrams, and mathematics. Inputs to troff are plain text files and can be created by any text editor.

Extensive macro packages have been created for various document styles. A typical distribution of troff includes the me macros for formatting research papers, man and mdoc macros for creating Unix man pages, mv macros for creating mountable transparencies, and the ms and mm macros for letters, books, technical memoranda, and reports.

== History ==
troff's origins can be traced to a text-formatting program called RUNOFF, which was written by Jerome H. Saltzer for MIT's CTSS operating system in the mid-1960s. (The name allegedly came from the phrase I'll run off a document.)

Bob Morris ported it to the GE 635 architecture and called the program roff (an abbreviation of runoff). It was rewritten as rf for the PDP-7, and at the same time (1969), Doug McIlroy rewrote an extended and simplified version of roff in the BCPL programming language.

The first version of Unix was developed on a PDP-7 which was sitting around Bell Labs. In 1971 the developers wanted to get a PDP-11 for further work on the operating system. In order to justify the cost for this system, they proposed that they would implement a document-formatting system for the Bell Labs patents department. This first formatting program was a reimplementation of McIllroy's roff, written by Joe F. Ossanna.

When they needed a more flexible language, a new version of roff called nroff (newer "roff") was written, which provided the basis for all future versions. When they got a Graphic Systems CAT phototypesetter, Ossanna modified nroff to support multiple fonts and proportional spacing. Dubbed troff, for typesetter roff, its sophisticated output amazed the typesetter manufacturer and confused peer reviewers, who thought that manuscripts using troff had been published before. As such, the name troff is pronounced /ˈtiːrɒf/ rather than */ˈtrɒf/.

With troff came nroff (they were actually almost the same program), which was for producing output for line printers and character terminals. It understood everything troff did, and ignored the commands which were not applicable, e.g., font changes.

Ossanna's troff was written in PDP-11 assembly language and produced output specifically for the CAT phototypesetter. He rewrote it in C, although it was now 7000 lines of uncommented code and still dependent on the CAT. As the CAT became less common, and was no longer supported by the manufacturer, the need to make it support other devices became a priority. Ossanna died before this task was completed, so Brian Kernighan took on the task of rewriting troff. The newly rewritten version produced a device-independent code which was very easy for post-processors to read and translate to the appropriate printer codes. Also, this new version of troff (often called ditroff for device independent troff) had several extensions, which included drawing functions. The program's documentation defines the output format of ditroff, which is used by many modern troff clones like GNU groff.

In 1983, troff was one of several UNIX tools available for Charles River Data Systems' UNOS operating system under Bell Laboratories license.

The troff collection of tools (including pre- and post-processors) was eventually called Documenter's WorkBench (DWB), and was under continuous development in Bell Labs and later at the spin-off Unix System Laboratories (USL) through 1994. At that time, SoftQuad took over the maintenance, although Brian Kernighan continued to improve troff on his own. Thus, there are at least the following variants of the original Bell Labs troff in use:

- the SoftQuad DWB, based on USL DWB 2.0 from 1994;
- the DWB 3.4 from Lucent Software Solutions (formerly USL);
- troff, Plan 9 edition.

While troff has been supplanted by other programs such as Interleaf, FrameMaker, and LaTeX, it is still being used quite extensively. It remains the default formatter for the UNIX documentation.

The software was reimplemented as groff for the GNU system beginning in 1990. In addition, due to the open sourcing of Ancient UNIX systems, as well as modern successors such as the ditroff-based open-sourced versions found on OpenSolaris and Plan 9 from Bell Labs, there are several versions of AT&T troff (CAT and ditroff-based) available under various open-source licenses.

== Macros ==
In general, one was not encouraged to use troff directly, but rather go through some easier-to-use interface. Troff includes macros that are run before starting to process the document. These macros include setting up page headers and footers, defining new commands, and influencing how the output will be formatted. The command-line argument for including a macro set is -mname, which has led to many macro sets being known as the base filename with a leading m.

The standard macro sets, with leading m are:

- man for creating manual pages
- mdoc for semantically annotated manual pages, replacing man in BSDs
- me for creating research papers
- mm for creating memorandums
- ms for creating books, reports, and technical documentation

The ms macros were the first of these, developed at AT&T, before they were supplanted by the mm macros. One goal of the mm macros was that they be usable by the typing pool at Bell Labs and, over time, this happened and the mm macros became a standard at Bell Labs. AT&T made the mm macros commercially available for System V Unix. In contrast, the me macros were developed at Berkeley.

An example of a simple business letter prepared with the mm macros would be:

.TL
.ND "January 10, 1993"
.AU "Ms. Jane Smith"
.AT "Upcoming appointment"
.MT 5
Reference #A12345
.sp 4
Mr. Samuel Jones
.sp 0
Field director, Bureau of Inspections
.sp 0
1010 Government Plaza
.sp 0
Capitoltown, ST
.sp 3
Dear Mr. Jones,
.sp 2
.P
Making reference to the noted obligation to submit for state inspection our newly created production process, we request that you consider the possible inappropriateness of subjecting the  innovative technologies of tomorrow to the largely antiquated requirements of yesterday.  If our great state is to prosper in the twenty-first century, we must take steps 
.B now ,
in 
.I this 
year of 
.I this 
decade, to prepare our industrial base for the interstate and international competition that is sure to appear.  Our new process does precisely that.  Please do not let it be undone by a regulatory environment that is no longer apt.
.P
Thank you for your consideration of our position.
.FC Sincerely
.SG

A comprehensive list of macros available is usually listed in a tmac(5) manual page.

== Preprocessors ==
As troff evolved, since there are several things which cannot be done easily in troff, several preprocessors were developed. These programs transform certain parts of a document into troff input, fitting naturally into the use of "pipelines" in Unix — sending the output of one program as the input to another (see pipes and filters). Typically, each preprocessor translates only sections of the input file that are specially marked, passing the rest of the file through unchanged. The embedded preprocessing instructions are written in a simple application-specific programming language, which provides a high degree of power and flexibility.

- eqn preprocessor allows mathematical formulae to be specified in simple and intuitive manner.
- tbl is a preprocessor for formatting tables.
- refer (and the similar program bib) processes citations in a document according to a bibliographic database.

Three preprocessors provide troff with drawing capabilities by defining a domain-specific language for describing the picture.

- pic is a procedural programming language providing various drawing functions like circle and box.
- ideal allows the drawing of pictures declaratively, deriving the picture by solving a system of simultaneous equations based on vectors and transformations described by its input.
- grn describes the pictures through graphical elements drawn at absolute coordinates, based on the gremlin file format defined by an early graphics workstation.

In addition, there is a command soelim that removes .so inclusion directives from the input text.

A typical structure of the pipeline might be:

soelim file | refer | ideal | pic | tbl | eqn | troff

Yet more preprocessors allow the drawing of more complex pictures by generating output for pic.

- grap draws charts, like scatter plots and histograms.
- chem draws chemical structure diagrams.
- dformat draws record-based data structures.

== Other front-ends ==
Several other front-ends have been developed that are intended to be friendlier interfaces to troff.

One of them is Sanscribe, originally developed at Berkeley and then enhanced during the 1980s by several users including Intel and InterACT. Used for writing memos, reports, documents, Sanscribe is built upon basic troff commands as well as the me macros and various pre- and post-processors such as soelim, eqn, tbl, grap, and pic. However it is a main program binary, not a preprocessor. The conditional inclusion capability renders it especially useful for maintaining multi-platform reference manuals. However, Sanscribe is fragile and prone to giving cryptic errors or producing weirdly formatted results.

A special-purpose front-end is vgrind, which generates nicely formatted source program listings, with such features as putting comments in italics, keywords in bold, and function names highlighted in margins. It can run either as a filter or as a main program with its output being passed to troff. It has support for the languages in use at Bell Labs facilities, including not just Fortran, C, and C++ but also domain-specific tools such as Bourne shell and yacc as well as those further afield such as Emacs Lisp and Icon.

A different approach is employed by the CADiZ suite of tools for the Z notation. Rather than the cadiz program being a preprocessor in the front of the pipeline, it interacts multiple times with troff as both input and output, using saved files rather than a pipe. CADiZ also contains its own set of macros, called .ZA to .ZZ.

== See also ==
- Desktop publishing
- DocBook
- groff GNU troff/nroff replacement
- nroff
- SGML
- TeX
- Scribe (markup language)
