= Terminal pager =

Console text viewing application

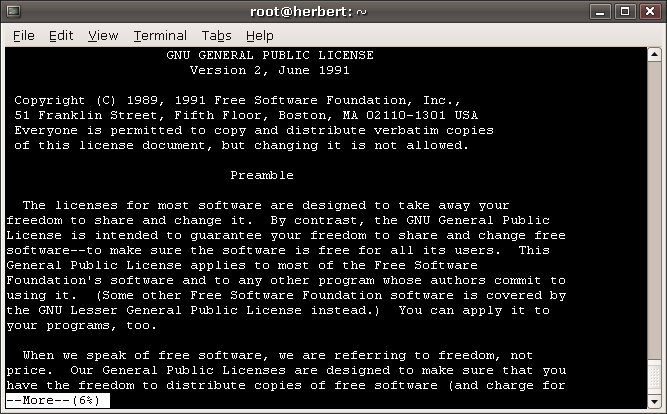
Screenshot of more, a popular terminal pager

A terminal pager, paging program or simply pager is a computer program used to view (but not modify) the contents of a text file moving down the file one line or one screen at a time. Some, but not all, pagers allow movement up a file. A popular cross-platform terminal pager is more, which can move forwards and backwards in text files but cannot move backwards in pipes. less is a more advanced pager that allows movement forward and backward, and contains extra functions such as search.

Some programs incorporate their own paging function, for example bash's tab completion function.

== Examples ==
- emacs -nw -e "(view-mode)"
- less
- mcview
- more
- most
- nano --view
- pg
- w3m
- Some git commands, such as git diff, use a pager by default. git --no-pager diff disables the pager. There are several other methods too.
