= List of DOS system files =

MS-DOS / PC DOS and some related disk operating systems use the files mentioned here.

System Files:

- IO.SYS (or IBMBIO.COM): This contains the system initialization code and builtin device drivers;
- MSDOS.SYS (or IBMDOS.COM): This contains the DOS kernel.

Command-line interpreter (Shell):

- COMMAND.COM: This is the command interpreter.

User configuration files:

- AUTOEXEC.BAT: This is run by the default shell (usually COMMAND.COM) to execute commands at startup.
- CONFIG.SYS: This contains statements to configure DOS and load device drivers.

Standard DOS utility programs:

- APPEND: Set a search path for data files.
- ASSIGN: Redirect requests for disk operations on one drive to a different drive.
- ATTRIB: Set or display file attributes.
- BACKUP / RESTORE: simple backup and restore utilities.
- CHKDSK: Check disk for file system integrity.
- COMP: File compare utility.
- DEBUG: Simple command line debugger.
- DELTREE: Delete a directory tree.
- DISKCOMP: Compare floppy disks.
- DISKCOPY: Copy floppy disks.
- DOSKEY: Command line editor.
- EDIT / EDLIN: Very basic text editor(s); EDLIN is in earlier versions.
- FC: File compare utility.
- FDISK: Partitions fixed disks.
- FIND: Find text in files.
- FORMAT: Formats disks.
- JOIN: Joins a drive letter to a subdirectory.
- LABEL: Set or remove a disk volume label.
- MEM: Display memory usage.
- MODE: Set modes for system devices.
- MORE: Display output one screen at a time.
- MOVE: Move files from one directory to another.
- PRINT: Print spooler.
- REPLACE: Replace files.
- SHARE: File sharing and locking support.
- SORT: Sorts input.
- SUBST: Substitutes a drive letter for a subdirectory.
- SYS: Transfers the system files to another drive to make it bootable.
- TREE: Display a directory tree.
- XCOPY: Extended file copy.

Standard DOS device drivers:

- ANSI.SYS: ANSI console driver.
- EMM386.EXE: Expanded memory manager.
- HIMEM.SYS: Extended memory manager.
- RAMDRIVE.SYS / VDISK.SYS: RAM disk; VDISK.SYS is in older versions of MS DOS
