= MS-DOS 7 =

Computer operating system

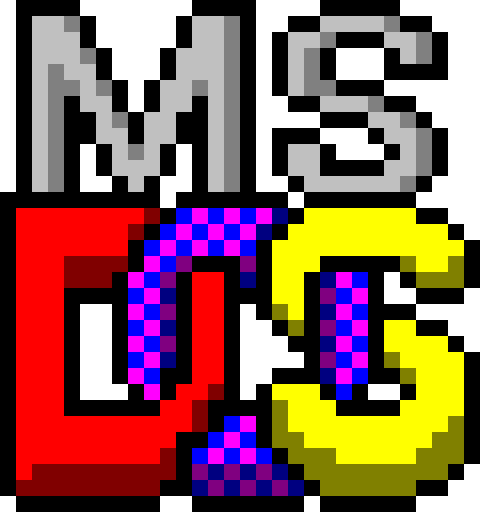

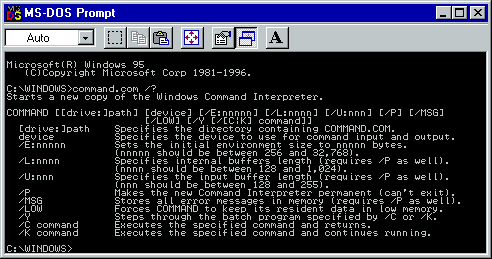
- MS-DOS 7.0 command.com runs in a Windows console on Windows 95.
- Developer: Microsoft
- Written in: x86 assembly
- OS family: MS-DOS, Windows 9x
- Source model: Closed source
- Initial release: 1995; 31 years ago
- Final release: 7.1 / 1999; 27 years ago
- Update method: Re-installation
- Package manager: None
- Supported platforms: x86
- Kernel type: Monolithic
- Default user interface: Command-line interface (COMMAND.COM)
- License: Proprietary
- Preceded by: MS-DOS 6
- Succeeded by: MS-DOS 8

Support status
- Unsupported as of July 11, 2006

MS-DOS 7 is a real-mode operating system for IBM PC compatibles. Unlike earlier versions of MS-DOS, it was not released separately by Microsoft, but included in the Windows 9x family of operating systems. Windows 95 RTM reports it as MS-DOS 7.0, and Windows 95 OSR 2.x and Windows 98 report as 7.1. The real-mode MS-DOS 7.x is contained in the IO.SYS file.

== Announcement ==
After the release of MS-DOS 6, Microsoft preannounced in 1994 that MS-DOS 7 would incorporate multitasking and a few other new features planned for the upcoming Windows 4.0, codenamed Chicago. IBM also promised a "fancy", multitasking PC DOS 7. Continuing what Computerworld called a "vaporware tornado", Microsoft also projected this revised combination of Windows and MS-DOS to require a low-end computer with only 4 MB of RAM. Windows 4.0 was released branded as Windows 95, and Microsoft canceled the standalone version of MS-DOS 7 and instead included it with Windows 95. The proposed multitasking and multithreading technology was canceled from MS-DOS 7.0.

== New features ==
MS-DOS 7.0 adds support for long filename (LFN) using the VFAT file system, whereas earlier versions do not show long filenames even with a driver such as DOSLFN. It supports larger extended memory (up to 4 GB) via its HIMEM.SYS driver. Various smaller improvements include enhanced DOS commands, more efficient use of UMB memory (COMMAND.COM and part of the DOS kernel are loaded high automatically), and using environment variables directly in the DOS command.

MS-DOS 7.1 adds FAT32 support for larger than 2 GB and up to 2 TB per volume. MS-DOS 7.0 and earlier only support FAT12 and FAT16. Logical block addressing (LBA) is supported in MS-DOS 7 for accessing larger hard disks, unlike earlier versions, which only supported cylinder-head-sector (CHS)-based addressing. Unlike MS-DOS 7.0, MS-DOS 7.1 recognizes a hard disk beyond the first 8.4 GB. Year 2000 support was added to DIR command via the new /4 option.

MS-DOS 7.x adds support for running the graphical interface of Windows 9x, which cannot be run on older MS-DOS releases. Even though VER command usually shows the Windows version, the MS-DOS version is also officially mentioned in other places. For example, Windows 95 OSR2 or Windows 98's VMM32.VXD file (renamed to VMM32.EXE) cannot be run directly on an earlier version of MS-DOS, or it will prompt the user to upgrade MS-DOS to version 7.1 or higher. In the case of Windows 95 RTM, the version number 7.0 is displayed in place of 7.1.

== Overview ==
According to Caldera, which sold DR-DOS, Windows 95 is not one integrated software product, but rather a combination of two products – MS-DOS 7.0 and Windows 4.0 – packaged together to look as a single product. Though MS-DOS 7.0 and Windows 4.0 could be readily segregated and marketed as different products, Microsoft stopped marketing Windows and MS-DOS separately with the release of Windows 95.

A major difference from earlier versions of MS-DOS is the usage of the MSDOS.SYS file. In MS-DOS 7, this is not a binary file, but a pure setting file. The older boot style, where Windows is not automatically started and the system boots into a DOS command shell, can use that same style by setting BootGUI=0 in the MSDOS.SYS file. Otherwise, since Windows 95, it will automatically start up on boot. However, this is only an automatic call for the command WIN.COM, the Windows starting program. Windows 95 and 98 are dependent on MS-DOS to boot the 32-bit kernel and to run legacy 16-bit MS-DOS device drivers. MS-DOS progressed as the base operating system of Windows 3.1x and Windows 9x. Windows 95 is on MS-DOS 7.0, and Windows 95 OSR2 and Windows 98 are on MS-DOS 7.1. By default, MS-DOS 7.0 is installed with Windows 95 to the C:\WINDOWS\COMMAND subdirectory and is loaded prior to the loading of the GUI system. More importantly, the DOS system, which handles files and disk partitioning, manages the disk storage system. Moreover, while IO.SYS is the kernel file of MS-DOS 7, JO.SYS is an alternate filename for IO.SYS that is used for "specific purposes" in MS-DOS 7. JO.SYS supports booting from a CD-ROM drive or a hard disk.

== Reception ==
At Microsoft's 1994 preannouncement, the stripped down Windows 4.0 with MS-DOS 7 was expected to be "at the expense of Windows NT" as the biggest competitor of the much more featureful and resource-consuming Windows NT.

== See also ==
- PC DOS 7
- List of DOS commands
- List of DOS system files
- Timeline of DOS operating systems
