= Windows System File =

Filename extension

- Filename extension: .sys
- Developed by: Microsoft
- Type of format: System file

.sys is a filename extension used in MS-DOS applications and Microsoft Windows operating systems. They are system files that contain device drivers or hardware configurations for the system.

Most DOS .sys files are real mode device drivers. Certain files using this extension are not, however:

- MSDOS.SYS and IO.SYSIO.SYS are core operating system files in MS-DOS and Windows 9x.
- CONFIG.SYS is a text file that contains various configuration options and specifies what device drivers will be loaded.
- COUNTRY.SYS is a binary database containing country and codepage related information for use with the CONFIG.SYS COUNTRY directive and the NLSFUNC driver.
- KEYBOARD.SYS is a binary database containing keyboard layout related information including short P-code sequences to be executed by an interpreter inside the KEYB keyboard driver.

System files are most commonly found within the Windows directory of a Windows installation. In particular, many SYS files are stored in the Windows\winsxs directory in later versions of Windows.

== File location ==
In Windows Vista and its successors, the .sys files are mainly found under the following paths:

C:\Windows\system32\drivers
C:\Windows\WinSxS

In MS-DOS, the file named MSDOS.SYS is used to copy the system files from one drive to another, allowing the second drive to be bootable. MSDOS.SYS is located in the root directory of the bootable drive/partition (normally C:\ for hard disks) and has the hidden, read-only, and system file attributes set.

== See also ==
- VxD
- Windows Driver Model
- Windows Driver Frameworks
- Fat binary (for crash-protected system files)
- .exe
- .dll
