= Boot disk =

Removable disk from which a computer can boot an operating system

A boot disk is a removable digital data storage medium from which a computer can load and run (boot) an operating system or utility program. The computer must have a built-in program which will load and execute a program from a boot disk meeting certain standards.

While almost all modern computers can boot from a hard drive containing the operating system and other software, they are not normally called boot disks because they are not removable media. Bootable fixed drives are called boot drives. CD-ROMs were the most common boot disk media, but have mostly been replaced by USB flash drives. Other media, such as magnetic or paper tape drives, or ZIP drives may be supported by older devices. The computer's BIOS must support booting from the device in question.

Boot disks can be used to recover a device if it won't start properly.

== Uses ==
Boot disks are used for:

- Operating system installation
- Data recovery
- Data purging
- Hardware or software troubleshooting
- BIOS flashing
- Customizing an operating environment
- Software demonstration
- Running a temporary operating environment, such as when using a Live USB drive.
- Administrative access in case of lost password for some operating systems
- Games (e.g. for Amiga home computers, running MS-DOS video games on modern computers by using a bootable MS-DOS or FreeDOS USB flash drive).

== Process ==
The term boot comes from the idea of lifting oneself by one's own bootstraps: the computer contains a tiny program (bootstrap loader) which will load and run a program found on a boot device. This program may itself be a small program designed to load a larger and more capable program, i.e., the full operating system. To enable booting without the requirement either for a mass storage device or to write to the boot medium, it is usual for the boot program to use some system RAM as a RAM disk for temporary file storage.

As an example, any computer compatible with the IBM PC is able with built-in software to load the contents of the first 512 bytes of a floppy and to execute it if it is a viable program; boot floppies have a very simple loader program in these bytes. The process is vulnerable to abuse; data floppies could have a virus written to their first sector which silently infects the host computer if switched on with the disk in the drive.

== Media ==
Bootable floppy disks ("boot floppies") for PCs usually contain DOS or miniature versions of Linux. The most commonly available floppy disk can hold only 1.4 MB of data in its standard format, making it impractical for loading large operating systems. The use of boot floppies is in decline, due to the availability of other higher-capacity options, such as CD-ROMs or USB flash drives.

== Device selection ==
A modern PC is configured to attempt to boot from various devices in a certain order. If a computer is not booting from the device desired, such as the floppy drive, the user may have to enter the BIOS Setup function by pressing a special key when the computer is first turned on (such as Delete, F1, F2 or F10), and then changing the boot order. More recent BIOSes permit the interruption of the final stage of the boot process and invoke the Boot Menu by pressing a function key (usually F11 or F12). This results in a list of bootable devices being presented, from which a selection may be made.

Apple silicon Macs display the Boot Menu when the power button is pressed and held, the older Mac computers with Intel processors will display the Boot Menu if user presses the ⌥ Option or Alt while the machine is starting.

== Requirements ==
Different operating systems use different boot disk contents. All boot disks must be compatible with the computer they are designed for.

MS-DOS/PC DOS/DR-DOS

- A valid boot sector in form of a volume boot record (VBR)
- IO.SYS or IBMBIO.COM
- MSDOS.SYS or IBMDOS.COM
- COMMAND.COM

All files must be for the same version of the operating system. Complete boot disks can be prepared in one operation by an installed operating system; details vary.

FreeDOS

- A valid boot sector on the disk
- COMMAND.COM
- KERNEL.SYS

Linux

- A bootloader such as SYSLINUX or GRUB
- Linux kernel
- Initial ram disk (initrd)

Windows Preinstallation Environment

- Windows Boot Manager
- BOOT.WIM

== See also ==
- Data recovery
- El Torito (CD-ROM standard)
- Live CD
- Protected Area Run Time Interface Extension Services (PARTIES)
- Self-booting disk
