= DOSKEY =

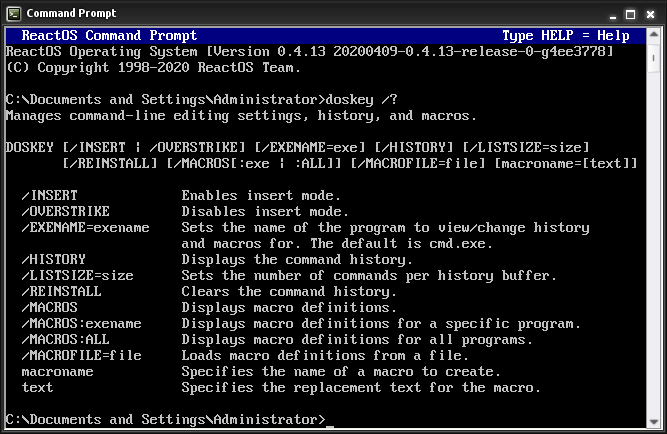
- The ReactOS doskey command
- Developers: Microsoft, IBM, Novell, ReactOS contributors
- Release: 1991, 34–35 years ago
- Operating system: MS-DOS, PC DOS, OS/2, eComStation, ArcaOS, Novell DOS 7, DR-DOS, Windows, ReactOS
- Platform: Cross-platform
- Type: Command
- Website: docs.microsoft.com/en-us/windows-server/administration/windows-commands/doskey

DOSKEY is a command in DOS, OS/2, Windows, and ReactOS that adds command history, macro functionality, and improved editing features to the COMMAND.COM and cmd.exe command-line interpreter shells.

== History ==
The command was included as a terminate-and-stay-resident program with MS-DOS and PC DOS versions 5 and later, then Windows 9x, and finally Windows 2000 and later.

In early 1989, functionality similar to DOSKEY was introduced with DR-DOS 3.40 with its HISTORY CONFIG.SYS directive. This enabled a user-configurable console input history buffer and recall as well as pattern search functionality on the console driver level, that is, fully integrated into the operating system and transparent to running applications. In the summer of 1991, DOSKEY was introduced in MS-DOS/PC DOS 5.0 in order to provide some of the same functionality. DOSKEY also added a macro expansion facility, though special support was required before applications such as command line processors could take advantage of it. Starting with Novell DOS 7 in 1993, the macro capabilities were provided by an external DOSKEY command as well. In order to also emulate the DOSKEY history buffer functionality under DR-DOS, the DR-DOS DOSKEY worked as a front end to the resident history buffer functionality, which remained part of the kernel.

DOSKEY has also been included in IBM OS/2 Version 2.0.

In current Windows NT-based operating systems, the DOSKEY functionality is built into CMD.EXE, although the DOSKEY command is still used to change its operation.

The DOSKEY command is not available in FreeDOS, which has such features built into the command interpreter.

== Usage ==
=== Command switches ===
DOSKEY allows the use of several command switches:

DOSKEY [/switch ...] [macroname=[text]]

/REINSTALL
Installs a new copy of DOSKEY.
/LISTSIZE=[size]
Sets size of command history buffer to size.
/MACROS
Displays all DOSKEY macros.

/MACROS:ALL
Displays all DOSKEY macros for all executables which have DOSKEY macros.
/MACROS:[executable name]
Displays all DOSKEY macros for the given executable.

/HISTORY
Displays all commands stored in memory.
/INSERT
Specifies that new text typed is inserted in old text.
/OVERSTRIKE
Specifies that new text overwrites old text.
/EXENAME=exename
Specifies the executable.
/MACROFILE=filename
Specifies a file of macros to install.
/APPEDIT
(undocumented – since MS-DOS 7)
/COMMAND
(undocumented – since MS-DOS 7)
/PERMANENT
(undocumented – since MS-DOS 7)
/SCRSIZE
(undocumented – since MS-DOS 7)
/XHISTORY
(undocumented – since MS-DOS 7)
[macroname]
Specifies a name for a macro created.
[text]
Specifies commands to record.

=== Keyboard shortcuts ===
During a DOSKEY session, the following keyboard shortcuts can be used:

↑ and ↓
Recall commands
Esc
Clears command line
Ctrl+Home
Clears command line from the cursor to the beginning of the line.
Ctrl+End
Clears command line from the cursor to the end of the line.
F7
Displays command history
Alt+F7
Clears command history
F8
Searches command history
F9
Selects a command by number
Alt+F10
Clears macro definitions

=== Command macros ===
DOSKEY implements support for command macros, a simple text-substitution facility which is used somewhat like command line aliases in other environments.

$T
Command separator. Allows multiple commands in a macro.
$1–$9
Batch parameters. Equivalent to %1-%9 in batch programs.
$*
Symbol replaced by everything following the macro name on command line.

== Alternatives ==
The absence of a command history in COMMAND.COM was a serious inconvenience ever since the earliest versions of MS-DOS. Numerous third-party programs have been written to address the issue; many were available long before Microsoft supplied DOSKEY. Some of them, including JP Software's 4DOS and NDOS, also provide additional editing capabilities lacking in DOSKEY, such as filename completion. Some of the better-known DOSKEY alternatives are Jack Gersbach's DOSEDIT, Chris Dunford's CED, Sverre Huseby's DOSED, Ashok Nadkarni's CMDEDIT, Steven Calwas's ANARKEY, Eric Tauck's TODDY, and enhanced DOSKEY written by Paul Houle.

Paul Houle's Enhanced DOSKEY is designed to be an enhanced drop-in replacement for the DOSKEY.COM that ships with MS-DOS and Windows 9x/Windows Me. It also has a smaller disk and memory-resident footprint. The primary added feature is command and file "auto-completion" via the Tab key. Version 2.5, released in 2014, also adds full support for long filenames (LFN).

== See also ==
- List of DOS commands
