= CHCP =

CHCP may refer to:

- Certification of Health Care Provider
- Certified Healthcare CPD Professional, a certification program managed by the Commission for Certification of Healthcare CPD Professionals
- CHCP (command), a shell command for setting the console code page
- College of Health Care Professions, a for-profit college located in Texas
- Combined heat, cooling, and power production, a form of trigeneration simultaneous mechanical power production
