= Windows kernel =

Windows kernel may refer to:

- Windows 9x kernel, used in Windows 95-98 and ME
- Windows NT kernel, used in all Windows NT systems (including Windows NT, 2000, XP, Vista, 7, 8, 8.1, 10 and 11)
