= WIN.COM =

Executable file used to load versions of Windows that run from DOS

- Developer(s): Microsoft
- Included with: Windows 1.0, Windows 2.0, Windows 3.x, Windows 9x
- Type: Windows loader

WIN.COM is the executable file used to load versions of Windows that run from DOS. In Windows 3.11 and its predecessors, it is executed either manually from the DOS prompt or as a line in AUTOEXEC.BAT. In Windows 95 and onward it is automatically invoked by IO.SYS after AUTOEXEC.BAT is processed. The file is present in the SYSTEM32 directory of some Windows NT-based versions of Windows (such as Windows 2000, Windows XP and Windows Vista) for backwards compatibility purposes.

== Usage ==
WIN.COM has several parameters that facilitate system recovery and diagnostics.

== Issues ==
Corruption or deletion of WIN.COM caused many issues for users of Windows 1.0, Windows 2.0, Windows 3.0, Windows 3.1, Windows 95, Windows 98, and Windows Me, and some early Windows viruses targeted WIN.COM. Corruption of WIN.COM would cause the system to be unable to load the graphical user interface. In all these versions (except for Windows Me without a boot disk), the system could still be booted to the underlying DOS prompt.

== See also ==
- AUTOEXEC.BAT
- COM file
- MS-DOS
