= Any key =

From "Press any key to continue" prompts

The pause command in DOS requests the user to "Press any key to continue."

In computing, "Press any key to continue" (or a similar text) was a historically used prompt to the user when it was necessary to pause processing. The system would resume after the user pressed any keyboard button.

== History ==
Early computers were typically operated using mechanical teleprinters, which provided a continuous printed record of their output. However, during the 1970s, these became obsolete and were replaced with visual display units, and text was lost once it scrolled off the top of the screen. To compensate, programs typically paused operation after displaying one screen of data, so that the user could observe the results and then press a key to move to the next screen.

A similar pause was also required when some physical action was required from the user, such as inserting a floppy disk or loading a printer with paper.

These prompts were commonplace on text-based operating systems prior to the development of graphical user interfaces, which typically included scrollbars to enable the user to view more than one screen/window of data. They are therefore no longer required as a means of paginating output, but the graphical equivalent (such as a modal dialog box containing the text "Click OK to continue") is still used for hardware interactions.

The prompt ("any key") is not strictly accurate, in that one is required to press a key which generates some sort of character. For the vast majority of computer systems, pressing modifier keys or lock keys would not cause processing to resume, as they do not produce an actual character that the program could detect.

Some Samsung remote controls for DVD players, as is the case of DVD-R130, have included an "anykey" to their interface. It is used to view the status of the DVD being watched.

== Cultural significance ==
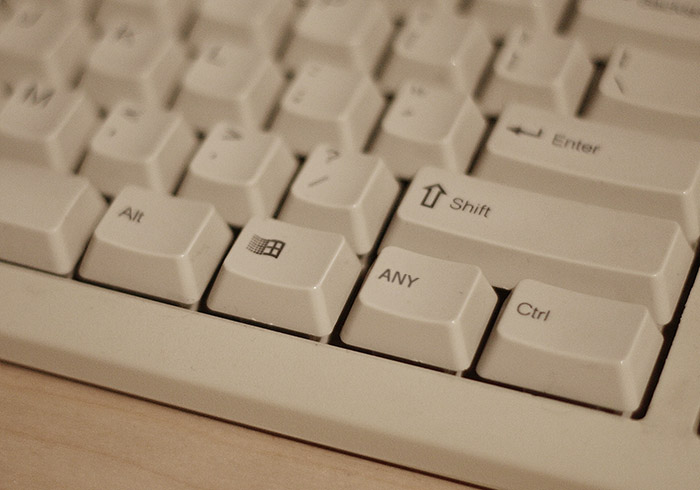
A picture of a keyboard which has been photo manipulated to include an "ANY" key.

A 1982 Apple Computer manual for developers warned:

Do not tell the user to "press any key." ... On the Apple II series computers, you cannot read every key by itself: RESET, SHIFT, CONTROL. We have also found in testing that new users, in particular, panic when asked to press any key. Over 80% of them will turn around and say, "but what key should I press?" In questioning them about this response, we discovered that they are quite convinced that even though the prompt implied that all keys were OK to press, some could be dangerous. Of course, they were quite right.

There are reports from as early as 1988 that some users have searched for such a key labelled "any", and called technical support when they have been unable to find it. The computer company Compaq even edited their FAQ to explain that the "any" key does not exist, and at one point considered replacing the command "Press any key" with "Press return key".

The concept of the "any key" has become a popular piece of computer-related humor, and was used as a gag on The Simpsons, in the seventh-season episode "King-Size Homer", where Homer Simpson searches his work computer's keyboard looking for "the any key"; he interprets the directive literally by typing out the word "any".

Plastic "ANY keys" with adhesive backings are available as novelty gifts.
