= List of DOS commands =

This article lists notable commands provided by the MS-DOS disk operating system (DOS), especially as used on an IBM PC compatible computer. Other DOS variants as well as the legacy Windows shell, Command Prompt (cmd.exe), provide many of these commands. Many other DOS variants are informally called DOS, but are not included in the scope of the list. The highly related variant, IBM PC DOS, is included. The list is not intended to be exhaustive, but does include commands covering the various releases.

Each command is implemented either as built-in to the command interpreter, COMMAND.COM, or as an external program. Although prevailing style is to write command names in all caps, the interpreter matches ignoring case.

== Commands ==
=== APPEND ===
Sets the path to be searched for data files or displays the current search path. The APPEND command is similar to the PATH command that tells DOS where to search for program files (files with a .COM, . EXE, or .BAT file name extension).

The command is available in MS-DOS versions 3.2 and later.

=== ASSIGN ===
Redirects requests for disk operations on one drive to a different drive. It can also display drive assignments or reset all drive letters to their original assignments.

The command is available in MS-DOS versions 3 through 5 and IBM PC DOS releases 2 through 5.

=== ATMDM ===
Lists connections and addresses seen by Windows ATM call manager.

=== ATTRIB ===
Changes or views the attributes of one or more files. Defaults to display the attributes of all files in the current directory. The file attributes available include read-only, archive, system, and hidden attributes. The command has the capability to process whole folders and subfolders of files and also process all files.

The command is available in MS-DOS versions 3 and later.

=== BACKUP and RESTORE ===
These are commands to backup and restore files from an external disk. These appeared in version 2, and continued to PC DOS 5 and MS-DOS 6 (PC DOS 7 had a deversioned check). In DOS 6, these were replaced by commercial programs (CPBACKUP, MSBACKUP), which allowed files to be restored to different locations.

=== BASIC and BASICA ===
Environment for programming in BASIC. IBM computers had BASIC 1.1 in ROM, and IBM's versions of BASIC used code in this ROM-BASIC, which allowed for extra memory in the code area. BASICA last appeared in IBM PC DOS 5.02, and in OS/2 (2.0 and later), the version had ROM-BASIC moved into the program code. Microsoft released GW-BASIC for machines with no ROM-BASIC. Some OEM releases had basic.com and basica.com as loaders for GW-BASIC.EXE. BASIC was dropped after MS-DOS 4, and PC DOS 5.02. OS/2 (which uses PC DOS 5), has it, while MS-DOS 5 does not.

=== BREAK ===
Instructs DOS to check whether the Ctrl and Break keys have been pressed before carrying out a program request.

The command is available in MS-DOS versions 2 and later.

=== CALL ===
Starts a batch file from within another batch file and returns when that one ends.

The command is available in MS-DOS versions 3.3 and later.

=== CD and CHDIR ===
Sets the working directory or with no arguments displays the current value. Both names, CD and CHDIR, refer to the same command and are abbreviations of the phrase "change directory".

The command is available in MS-DOS versions 2 and later.

=== CHCP ===
Either displays or changes the active code page used to display character glyphs in a console window. Similar functionality can be achieved with MODE CON: CP SELECT=yyy.

The command is available in MS-DOS versions 3.3 and later.

=== CHKDSK ===
Verifies and possibly fixes data integrity of a storage volume.

The command is available in MS-DOS versions 1 and later.

=== CHOICE ===
Prompts the user to select one item from a set of single-character choices. The command was introduced as an external command with MS-DOS 6.0, Novell DOS 7 and PC DOS 7.0. Earlier versions of DR-DOS supported this function with the built-in switch command (for numeric choices) or by beginning a command with a question mark. This command was formerly called ync (yes-no-cancel).

=== CLS ===
The CLS or CLRSCR command clears the terminal screen.

The command is available in MS-DOS versions 2 and later.

=== COMMAND ===
Start a new instance of the command interpreter.

The command is available in MS-DOS versions 1 and later.

=== COMP ===
Show differences between any two files, or any two sets of files.

The command is available in MS-DOS versions 3.3 through 5 and IBM PC DOS releases 1 through 5.

=== COPY ===
Makes copies of files.

The command is available in MS-DOS versions 1 and later.

=== CTTY ===
Defines the terminal device (for example, COM1) to use for input and output.

The command is available in MS-DOS versions 2 and later.

=== DATE ===
Displays the system date and prompts the user to enter a new date. Complements the TIME command.

The command is available in MS-DOS versions 1 and later.

=== DBLBOOT ===
A batch file added to DOS 6.X Supplemental Disks to help create DoubleSpace boot floppies.

=== DBLSPACE ===
A disk compression utility supplied with MS-DOS version 6.0 (released in 1993) and version 6.2.

=== DEBUG ===
A primitive assembler and disassembler.

=== DEFRAG ===
Analyzes the file fragmentation of a disk drive and defragments a drive. This command is called DEFRAG in MS-DOS/PC DOS and diskopt in DR-DOS.

The command is available in MS-DOS versions 6 and later.

=== DEL and ERASE ===
Deletes files. Both names provide the same functionality.

The command is available in MS-DOS versions 1 and later.

=== DELTREE ===
Deletes a directory along with all of the files and subdirectories that it contains. Normally, it will ask for confirmation of the potentially dangerous action. Since the RD (RMDIR) command can not delete a directory if the directory is not empty (except in Windows NT & 10), the DELTREE command can be used to delete the whole directory.

The deltree command is included in certain versions of Microsoft Windows and MS-DOS operating systems. It is specifically available only in versions of MS-DOS 6.0 and higher, and in Microsoft Windows 9x. In Windows NT, the functionality provided exists but is handled by the command rd or rmdir which has slightly different syntax. In Windows 10, the command switch is RD /S or RMDIR /S.

=== DIR ===
Displays the contents of a directory. Output consists of the disk's volume label and serial number; one directory or filename per line, including the filename extension, the file size in bytes, and the date and time the file was last modified; and the total number of files listed, their cumulative size, and the free space (in bytes) remaining on the disk. The command is one of the few commands that exist from the first versions of DOS. The command can display files in subdirectories. The resulting directory listing can be sorted by various criteria and filenames can be displayed in a chosen format.

=== DISKCOMP ===
Compares the complete contents of a floppy disk to another one.

The command is available in MS-DOS versions 3.2 and later and IBM PC DOS releases 1 and later.

=== DISKCOPY ===
Copies the complete contents of a diskette to another diskette.

The command is available in MS-DOS versions 2 and later.

=== DOSKEY ===
Adds command history, macro functionality, and improved editing features to the command-line interpreter.

The command is available in MS-DOS versions 5 and later.

=== DOSSIZE ===
Displays how much memory various DOS components occupy.

=== DRVSPACE ===
A disk compression utility supplied with MS-DOS version 6.22.

=== ECHO ===
Prints text to the DOS equivalent of the standard output stream. Usually, this means directly to the screen, but the output can be redirected, like any other command, to files or devices. Often used in batch file.

Another important use of the echo command is to toggle echoing of commands on and off in batch files. Traditionally batch files begin with the @echo off statement. This says to the interpreter that echoing of commands should be off during the whole execution of the batch file, thus resulting in a "tidier" output (the @ symbol declares that this particular command (echo off) should also be executed without echo.)

The command is available in MS-DOS versions 2 and later.

=== EDIT ===
A full-screen text editor, included with MS-DOS versions 5 and 6, OS/2 and Windows NT to 4.0. The corresponding program in Windows 95 and later, and Windows 2000 and later is Edit v2.0. PC DOS 6 and later use the DOS E Editor and DR-DOS used editor up to version 7.

=== EDLIN ===
DOS line-editor. It can be used with a script file, like debug, this makes it of some use even today. The absence of a console editor in MS-DOS/PC DOS 1–4 created an after-market for third-party editors.

In DOS 5, an extra command "?" was added to give the user much-needed help.

DOS 6 was the last version to contain EDLIN; for MS-DOS 6, it's on the supplemental disks, while PC DOS 6 had it in the base install. Windows NT 32-bit, and OS/2 have Edlin.

=== EMM386 ===
Enables or disables EMM386 expanded-memory support on a computer with an 80386 or higher processor.

The command is available in MS-DOS versions 5 and later.

=== ERASE ===
See: DEL and ERASE

=== EXE2BIN ===
Converts an executable (.exe) file into a binary file with the extension .com, which is a memory image of the program.

The size of the resident code and data sections combined in the input .exe file must be less than 64 KB. The file must also have no stack segment.

The command is available in MS-DOS versions 1 through 5. It is available separately for version 6 on the Supplemental Disk.

=== EXIT ===
Exits the current command processor. If the exit is used at the primary command, it has no effect unless in a DOS window under Microsoft Windows, in which case the window is closed and the user returns to the desktop.

The command is available in MS-DOS versions 2 and later.

=== EXPAND ===
The Microsoft File Expansion Utility is used to uncompress one or more compressed cabinet files (.CAB). The command dates back to 1990 and was supplied on floppy disc for MS-DOS versions 5 and later.

=== FAKEMOUS ===
An IBM PS/2 mouse utility used with AccessDOS. It is included on the MS-DOS 6 Supplemental Disk. AccessDOS assists persons with disabilities.

=== FASTHELP ===
Provides information for MS-DOS commands.

=== FASTOPEN ===
Provides accelerated access to frequently-used files and directories.

The command is available in MS-DOS versions 3.3 and later.

=== FC ===
Shows differences between two files, or two sets of files.

The command is available in MS-DOS versions 2 and later – primarily non-IBM releases.

=== FDISK ===
Manipulates hard disk partition tables. The name derives from IBM's habit of calling hard drives fixed disks. FDISK has the ability to display information about, create, and delete DOS partitions or logical DOS drive. It can also install a standard master boot record on the hard drive.

The command is available in MS-DOS versions 3.2 and later and IBM PC DOS 2.0 releases and later.

=== FIND ===
A filter to find lines in the input data stream that contain or don't contain a specified string and send these to the output data stream. It may also be used as a pipe.

The command is available in MS-DOS versions 2 and later.

=== FINDSTR ===
A GREP-oriented FIND-like utility. Among its uses is the logical-OR lacking in FIND.

FINDSTR "YES NO MAYBE" *.txt

would find all TXT files with one or more of the above-listed words YES, NO, MAYBE.

=== FOR ===
Iteration: repeats a command for each out of a specified set of files. The FOR loop can be used to parse a file or the output of a command.

The command is available in MS-DOS versions 2 and later.

=== FORMAT ===
Deletes the FAT entries and the root directory of the drive/partition, and reformats it for MS-DOS. In most cases, this should only be used on floppy drives or other removable media. This command can potentially erase everything on a computer's drive.

The command is available in MS-DOS versions 1 and later.

=== GOTO ===
Transfers execution to a specified label. Labels are specified at the beginning of a line, with a colon (:likethis).

The command is available in MS-DOS versions 2 and later.

Used in Batch files.

=== GRAFTABL ===
Enables the display of an extended character set in graphics mode.

The command is available in MS-DOS versions 3 through 5.

=== GRAPHICS ===
A TSR program to enable the sending of graphical screen dump to printer by pressing <Print Screen>.

The command is available in MS-DOS versions 3.2 and later and IBM PC DOS releases 2 and later.

=== HELP ===
Gives help about DOS commands.

The command is available in MS-DOS versions 5 thru Windows XP. Full-screen command help is available in MS-DOS versions 6 and later. Beginning with Windows XP, the command processor "DOS" offers builtin-help for commands by using /? (e.g. COPY /?)

=== IF ===
A conditional statement, that allows branching of the program execution. It evaluates the specified condition, and only if it is true, then it executes the remainder of the command line. Otherwise, it skips the remainder of the line and continues with next command line.

Used in Batch files.

The command is available in MS-DOS versions 2 and later.

=== INTERSVR and INTERLNK ===
In MS-DOS; filelink in DR-DOS.

Network PCs using a null modem cable or LapLink cable. The server-side version of InterLnk, it also immobilizes the machine it's running on as it is an active app (As opposed to a terminate-and-stay-resident program) which must be running for any transfer to take place. DR-DOS' filelink is executed on both the client and server.

New in PC DOS 5.02, MS-DOS 6.0.

=== JOIN ===
Attaches a drive letter to a specified directory on another drive. The opposite can be achieved via the SUBST command.

The command is available in MS-DOS versions 3 through 5. It is available separately for versions 6.2 and later on the Supplemental Disk.

=== KEYB ===
Selects a keyboard layout.

The command is available in MS-DOS versions 3.3 and later.

From DOS 3.0 through 3.21, there are instead per-country commands, namely KEYBFR, KEYBGR, KEYBIT, KEYBSP and KEYBUK.

=== LABEL ===
Changes the label on a logical drive, such as a hard disk partition or a floppy disk.

The command is available in MS-DOS versions 3.1 and later and IBM PC DOS releases 3 and later.

=== LASTDRIVE ===
Used in the CONFIG.SYS file to set the maximum number of drives that can be accessed.

The command is available in MS-DOS versions 3.0 and later.

=== LINK4 ===
Microsoft 8086 Object Linker

=== LOADFIX ===
Loads a program above the first 64K of memory, and runs the program. The command is available in MS-DOS versions 5 and later. It is included only in MS-DOS/PC DOS. DR-DOS used memmax, which opened or closed lower, upper, and video memory access, to block the lower 64K of memory.

=== LOADHIGH and LH ===
Loads a program into the upper memory area.

The command is available in MS-DOS versions 5 and later.

It is called hiload in DR-DOS.

=== MD or MKDIR ===
Makes a new directory. The parent of the directory specified will be created if it does not already exist.

The command is available in MS-DOS versions 2 and later.

=== MEM ===
Displays memory usage. It is capable of displaying program size and status, memory in use, and internal drivers. It is an external command.

The command is available in MS-DOS versions 4 and later and DR DOS releases 5.0 and later.

On earlier DOS versions the memory usage could be shown by running CHKDSK. In DR DOS the parameter /A could be used to only show the memory usage.

=== MEMMAKER ===
Starting with version 6, MS-DOS included the external program MemMaker which was used to free system memory (especially Conventional memory) by automatically reconfiguring the AUTOEXEC.BAT and CONFIG.SYS files. This was usually done by moving TSR programs and device drivers to the upper memory. The whole process required two system restarts. Before the first restart the user was asked whether to enable EMS Memory, since use of expanded memory required a reserved 64KiB region in upper memory. The first restart inserted the SIZER.EXE program which gauged the memory needed by each TSR or Driver. MemMaker would then calculate the optimal Driver and TSR placement in upper memory and modify the AUTOEXEC.BAT and CONFIG.SYS accordingly, and reboot the second time.

MEMMAKER.EXE and SIZER.EXE were developed for Microsoft by Helix Software Company and were eliminated starting in MS-DOS 7 (Windows 95); however, they could be obtained from Microsoft's FTP server as part of the OLDDOS.EXE package, alongside other tools.

PC DOS uses another program called RamBoost to optimize memory, working either with PC DOS's HIMEM/EMM386 or a third-party memory manager. RamBoost was licensed to IBM by Central Point Software.

=== MIRROR ===
Saves disk storage information that can be used to recover accidentally erased files.

The command is available in MS-DOS version 5. It is available separately for versions 6.2 and later on Supplemental Disk.

=== MODE ===
Configures system devices. Changes graphics modes, adjusts keyboard settings, prepares code pages, and sets up port redirection.

The command is available in MS-DOS versions 3.2 and later and IBM PC DOS releases 1 and later.

=== MORE ===
Paginates text, so that one can view files containing more than one screen of text. More may also be used as a filter. While viewing MORE text, the return key displays the next line, the space bar displays the next page.

The command is available in MS-DOS versions 2 and later.

=== MOVE ===
Moves files or renames directories.

The command is available in MS-DOS versions 6 and later.

DR-DOS used a separate command for renaming directories, rendir.

=== MSAV ===
Scans the computer for known viruses.

The command is available in MS-DOS versions 6 and later.

=== MSBACKUP ===
Used to backup or restore files from one disk to another.

The New York Times said that MSBACKUP "is much better and faster than the old BACKUP command used in earlier versions of DOS, but it does lack some of the advanced features found in backup software packages that are sold separately. There is another offering, named MWBACKUP, that is GUI-oriented. It was introduced for Windows for Workgroups (3.11).

The MSBACKUP command is available in MS-DOS versions 6 and later.

=== MSCDEX ===
A driver executable which allows DOS programs to recognize, read, and control CD-ROMs.

The command is available in MS-DOS versions 6 and later.

=== MSD ===
Provides detailed technical information about the computer's hardware and software. MSD was new in MS-DOS 6; the PC DOS version of this command is QCONFIG. The command appeared first in Word2, and then in Windows 3.10.

=== MSHERC ===
A TSR graphics driver supplied with Microsoft QuickC, QuickBASIC, and the C Compiler, to allow use of the Hercules adapter high-resolution graphics capability (720 x 348, 2 colors).

=== NLSFUNC ===
Loads extended nationalization and localization support from COUNTRY.SYS, and changed the codepage of drivers and system modules resident in RAM.

In later versions of DR-DOS 6, NLSFUNC relocated itself into the HiMem area, thereby freeing a portion of the nearly invaluable lower 640KiB that constituted the ”conventional” memory available to software.

The command is available in MS-DOS versions 3.3 and later.

=== PATH ===
Displays or sets a search path for executable files.

The command is available in MS-DOS versions 2 and later.

=== PAUSE ===
Suspends processing of a batch program and displays the message Press any key to continue. . ., if not given other text to display.

The command is available in MS-DOS versions 1 and later.

=== PING ===
Allows the user to test the availability of a network connection to a specified host. Hostnames are usually resolved to IP addresses.

It is not included in many DOS versions; typically ones with network stacks will have it as a diagnostic tool.

=== POWER ===
Turns power management on and off, reports the status of power management, and sets levels of power conservation. It is an external command.

The command is available in MS-DOS versions 6 and later.

=== PRINT ===
Adds or removes files in the print queue. This command was introduced in MS-DOS version 2. Before that there was no built-in support for background printing files. The user would usually use the copy command to copy files to LPT1.

=== PROMPT ===
Allows the user to change the prompt in the command screen. The default prompt is $p$g (i.e. PROMPT $p$g), which displays the drive, the current path, and a greater than sign ">" as the prompt, but can be changed to anything. PROMPT $d, displays the current system date as the prompt. Type PROMPT /? in the cmd screen for help on this function.

The command is available in MS-DOS versions 2 and later and IBM PC DOS releases 2.1 and later.

=== PS ===
A utility inspired by the UNIX/XENIX ps command. It also provides a full-screen mode, similar to the top utility on UNIX systems.

=== QBASIC ===
An integrated development environment and BASIC interpreter.

The command is available in MS-DOS versions 5 and later.

=== RD or RMDIR ===
Remove a directory (delete a directory); by default the directories must be empty of files for the command to succeed.

The command is available in MS-DOS versions 2 and later.

The deltree command in some versions of MS-DOS and all versions of Windows 9x removes non-empty directories.

=== RECOVER ===
A primitive filesystem error recovery utility included in MS-DOS / IBM PC DOS.

The command is available in MS-DOS versions 2 through 5.

=== REM ===
Remark (comment) command, normally used within a batch file, and for DR-DOS, PC/MS-DOS 6 and above, in CONFIG.SYS. This command is processed by the command processor. Thus, its output can be redirected to create a zero-byte file. REM is useful in logged sessions or screen-captures. One might add comments by way of labels, usually starting with double-colon (::). These are not processed by the command processor.

=== REN ===
Renames a file. Unlike the move command, this command cannot be used to rename subdirectories, or rename files across drives. Mass renames can be accomplished by the use of the wildcards characters asterisk (*) and question mark (?).

The command is available in MS-DOS versions 1 and later.

=== REPLACE ===
Replaces computer files or adds new files to a target directory.

The command is available in MS-DOS versions 3.2 and later.

=== RESTORE ===
See: BACKUP and RESTORE

=== SCANDISK ===
Disk diagnostic utility. Scandisk was a replacement for the chkdsk utility, starting with MS-DOS version 6.2 and later. Its primary advantages over chkdsk is that it is more reliable and has the ability to run a surface scan which finds and marks bad clusters on the disk. It also provided mouse point-and-click TUI, allowing for interactive session to complement command-line batch run. chkdsk had surface scan and bad cluster detection functionality included, and was used again on Windows NT-based operating systems.

=== SELECT ===
Formats a disk and installs country-specific information and keyboard codes. It was initially only available with IBM PC DOS. The version included with PC DOS 3.0 and 3.1 is hard-coded to transfer the operating system from A: to B:, while from PC DOS 3.2 onward you can specify the source and destination, and can be used to install DOS to the harddisk.

The version included with MS-DOS 4 and PC DOS 4 is no longer a simple command-line utility, but a full-fledged installer.

The command is available in MS-DOS versions 3.3 and 4 and IBM PC DOS releases 3 through 4.

This command is no longer included in DOS Version 5 and later, where it has been replaced by SETUP.

=== SET ===
Sets environment variables.

The command is available in MS-DOS versions 2 and later.

cmd.exe in Windows NT 2000, 4DOS, 4OS2, 4NT, and a number of third-party solutions allow direct entry of environment variables from the command prompt. From at least Windows 2000, the set command allows for the evaluation of strings into variables, thus providing inter alia a means of performing integer arithmetic.

=== SETUP ===
The command is available in MS-DOS versions 5 and later. This command does a computer setup. With all computers running DOS versions 4 and later, it runs the computer setup, such as Windows 95 setup and Windows 98 setup.

=== SETVER ===
A TSR program designed to return a different value to the version of DOS that is running. This allows programs that look for a specific version of DOS to run under a different DOS.

The command is available in MS-DOS versions 5 and later.

=== SHARE ===
Installs support for file sharing and locking capabilities.

The command is available in MS-DOS versions 3 and later.

=== SHIFT ===
Increases number of replaceable parameters to more than the standard ten for use in batch files. This is done by changing the position of replaceable parameters. It replaces each of the replacement parameters with the subsequent one (e.g. %0 with %1, %1 with %2, etc.).

The command is available in MS-DOS versions 2 and later.

=== SIZER ===
Used by MemMaker during the memory-optimization process. Not intended to be started directly from the command prompt.

=== SMARTDRV ===
The command is available in MS-DOS versions 6 and later.

=== SORT ===
A filter to sort lines in the input data stream and send them to the output data stream. Similar to the Unix command sort. Handles files up to 64k. This sort is always case insensitive.

The command is available in MS-DOS versions 2 and later.

=== SUBST ===
A utility to map a subdirectory to a drive letter. The opposite can be achieved via the JOIN command.

The command is available in MS-DOS versions 3.1 and later.

=== SYS ===
A utility to make a volume bootable. Sys rewrites the Volume Boot Code (the first sector of the partition that SYS is acting on) so that the code, when executed, will look for IO.SYS. SYS also copies the core DOS system files, IO.SYS, MSDOS.SYS, and COMMAND.COM, to the volume. SYS does not rewrite the Master Boot Record, contrary to widely held belief.

The command is available in MS-DOS versions 1 and later.

=== TELNET ===
Remote terminal client. Often used to manage and test network connectivity.

=== TIME ===
Display the system time and waits for the user to enter a new time. Complements the DATE command.

The command is available in MS-DOS versions 1 and later.

=== TITLE ===
Enables a user to change the title of their MS-DOS window.

=== TREE ===
Graphically displays the path of each directory and sub-directories on the specified drive. An external command,

The command is available in MS-DOS versions 3.2 and later and IBM PC DOS releases 2 and later.

=== TRUENAME ===
Internal command that expands the name of a file, directory, or drive, and display its absolute pathname as the result. It will expand relative pathnames, SUBST drives, and JOIN directories, to find the actual directory.

For example, in DOS 7.1, if the current directory is C:\WINDOWS\SYSTEM, then

C:\WINDOWS\SYSTEM>TRUENAME ..\WIN.INI
C:\WINDOWS\WIN.INI

The argument does not need to refer to an existing file or directory: TRUENAME will output the absolute pathname as if it did. Also TRUENAME does not search in the PATH.
For example, in DOS 5, if the current directory is C:\TEMP, then TRUENAME command.com will display C:\TEMP\COMMAND.COM (which does not exist), not C:\DOS\COMMAND.COM (which does and is in the PATH).

This command displays the UNC pathnames of mapped network or local CD drives. This command is an undocumented DOS command. The help switch "/?" defines it as a "Reserved command name". It is available in MS-DOS version 5.00 and later, including the DOS 7 and 8 in Windows 95/98/ME. The C library function realpath performs this function. The Microsoft Windows NT command processors do not support this command, including the versions of command.com for NT.

=== TYPE ===
Displays a file. The more command is frequently used in conjunction with this command, e.g. type long-text-file | more. TYPE can be used to concatenate files (type file1 file2 > file3); however this won't work for large files—use copy command instead.

The command is available in MS-DOS versions 1 and later.

=== UNDELETE ===
Restores file previously deleted with del. By default all recoverable files in the working directory are restored; options are used to change this behavior. If the MS-DOS mirror TSR program is used, then deletion tracking files are created and can be used by undelete.

The command is available in MS-DOS versions 5 and later.

=== UNFORMAT ===
MS-DOS version 5 introduced the quick format option (Format /Q) which removes the disk's file table without deleting any of the data. The same version also introduced the UNFORMAT command to undo the effects of a quick format, restoring the file table and making all the files accessible again.

UNFORMAT only works if invoked before any further changes have overwritten the drive's contents.

=== VER ===
An internal DOS command, that reports the DOS version presently running, and since MS-DOS 5, whether DOS is loaded high.

The command is available in MS-DOS versions 2 and later.

=== VERIFY ===
Enables or disables the feature to determine if files have been correctly written to disk (You can enable the verify command by typing "verify on" on Command Prompt and pressing enter. To display the current VERIFY setting, type VERIFY without a parameter. To turn off the feature, type "verify off"). If no parameter is provided, the command will display the current setting.

The command is available in MS-DOS versions 2 and later.

=== VOL ===
An internal command that displays the disk volume label and serial number.

The command is available in MS-DOS versions 2 and later.

=== VSAFE ===
A TSR program that continuously monitors the computer for viruses.

The command is available in MS-DOS versions 6 and later.

=== XCOPY ===
Copy entire directory trees. Xcopy is a version of the copy command that can move files and directories from one location to another.

XCOPY usage and attributes can be obtained by typing XCOPY /? in the DOS Command line.

The command is available in MS-DOS versions 3.2 and later.

== See also ==
- Category:Windows commands
- List of CONFIG.SYS directives
- Timeline of DOS operating systems
