= Windows 9x =

Series of Microsoft operating systems

- Screenshot of Windows 95, the first version of Windows in the 9x series
- Developer: Microsoft
- Written in: C, C++, Assembly
- Working state: Discontinued
- Source model: Closed source
- Initial release: 4.00.950 / July 14, 1995; 31 years ago (as Windows 95)
- Final release: 4.90.3000 / June 19, 2000; 26 years ago (as Windows Me)
- Update method: Windows Update
- Supported platforms: IA-32
- Kernel type: Monolithic
- Userland: Windows API
- Influenced by: MS-DOS, OS/2, Windows 2.x, Windows 3.x, VAX/VMS
- Default user interface: Windows shell (Graphical)
- License: Proprietary commercial software
- Preceded by: Windows 3.1 (1992-1993)
- Succeeded by: Windows XP (2001)

Support status
- Mainstream support for Windows 95 ended on December 31, 2000. Extended support ended on December 31, 2001. Mainstream support for Windows 98 ended on June 30, 2002. Mainstream support for Windows Me ended on December 31, 2003. Extended support for both ended on July 11, 2006.

Windows 9x (also known as Win9x) is a generic term referring to a former line of Windows, a family of operating systems produced by Microsoft. It had releases between 1995 and 2000, and were based on the kernel first introduced in Windows 95, which was continuously updated in later versions. MS-DOS support was retained in order to facilitate booting into Windows as well as providing real mode support for DOS.

The first version of the Windows 9x series was Windows 95, which was succeeded by Windows 98 and then Windows Me, which was the third and last version of Windows in the series before it was superseded by Windows XP. (Note: The term Windows 9x is usually used to refer to the three operating systems, as in this tutorial. Sometimes Windows Me is included as a member of Windows 9x, e.g in this version list Archived June 19, 2010, at the Wayback Machine. In this article the term Windows 9x is used to include Windows 95, 98, and Me.) It is predominantly known for its use in home desktops. In 1998, Windows made up 82% of operating system market share.

The internal release number for versions of Windows 9x is 4.x. The internal versions for Windows 95, 98, and Me are 4.0, 4.1, and 4.9, respectively. Previous MS-DOS-based versions of Windows used version numbers of 3.2 or lower. Windows NT, which was aimed at professional users such as networks and businesses, used a similar but separate version number between 3.1 and 4.0. Since the release of Windows XP, all versions of Windows are based on the Windows NT codebase.

== History ==
=== Windows prior to 95 ===
The first independent version of Microsoft Windows, version 1.0, released on November 20, 1985, achieved little popularity. Its name was initially "Interface Manager". However, Rowland Hanson, the head of marketing at Microsoft, convinced the company that the name Windows would be more appealing to consumers. Windows 1.0 was not a complete operating system, but rather an "operating environment" that extended MS-DOS. Consequently, it shared the inherent flaws and problems of MS-DOS.

The second installment of Microsoft Windows, version 2.0, was released on December 9, 1987, and used the real-mode memory model, which confined it to a maximum of 1 megabyte of memory. In such a configuration, it could run under another multitasking system like DESQview, which used the 286 Protected Mode.

Microsoft Windows scored a significant success with Windows 3.0, released in 1990. In addition to improved capabilities given to native applications, Windows also allowed users to better multitask older MS-DOS-based software compared to Windows/386, thanks to the introduction of virtual memory.

Microsoft developed Windows 3.1, which included several improvements to Windows 3.0. It also excluded support for Real mode, and only ran on an Intel 80286 or better processor. Windows 3.1 was released on April 6, 1992. In November 1993 Microsoft also released Windows 3.11, a touch-up to Windows 3.1 which included all of the patches and updates that followed the release of Windows 3.1 in early 1992.

Meanwhile, Microsoft continued to develop Windows NT. The main architect of the system was Dave Cutler, one of the chief architects of VMS at Digital Equipment Corporation. Microsoft hired him in August 1988 to create a successor to OS/2, but Cutler created a completely new system instead based on his MICA project at Digital. The first version of Windows NT, Windows NT 3.1, would be released on July 27, 1993, and used Windows 3.1's interface.

A year before development of Windows 3.1's successor (Windows 95, code-named Chicago) began, Microsoft announced at its 1991 Professional Developers Conference that they would be developing a successor to Windows NT code-named Cairo. Based on the Windows NT kernel, Cairo was a next-generation operating system that was to feature as many new technologies into Windows that would have fulfilled Bill Gates' vision of "Information at your fingertips", including a new user interface with an object-based file system, of which the former officially debuted four years later with Windows 95 while the latter would later be adopted as WinFS during the development of Windows Vista. Microsoft publicly demonstrated Cairo at the 1993 Professional Developers Conference, complete with a demo system running Cairo for all attendees to use.

According to Microsoft's product plan at the time, Cairo was planned to be released as late as July 1996 following its development. However, it had become apparent that Cairo was a much more difficult project than Microsoft had anticipated, and the project was subsequently cancelled five years into development. A subset of features from Cairo were eventually added into Windows NT 4.0, released on August 24, 1996, albeit without the object file system.

Some people viewed Cairo as the successor to Windows NT and Windows 3.1's successor, Chicago (Windows 95), under the implication that the two operating systems would be combined under a single unified system. Despite attempts at merging the Windows NT and DOS-based versions of Windows under a single operating platform (which was briefly done with the eventually-canceled Neptune project in the late-1990s), Windows NT and DOS-based versions of Windows would not be truly unified until Windows XP nearly five years later, when Microsoft began to merge its consumer and business line of Windows under a singular brand name based on Windows NT.

=== Windows 95 ===
Wordmark logo for Windows 95

After Windows 3.11, Microsoft began to develop a new consumer oriented version of the operating system code-named Chicago. Chicago was designed to have support for 32-bit preemptive multitasking, that of which was available in OS/2 and Windows NT, although a 16-bit kernel would remain for the sake of backward compatibility. The Win32 API first introduced with Windows NT was adopted as the standard 32-bit programming interface, with Win16 compatibility being preserved through a technique known as "thunking". A new GUI was not originally planned as part of the release, although elements of the Cairo user interface were borrowed and added as other aspects of the release (notably Plug and Play) slipped (and indeed after Cairo was cancelled 5 years in development).

Microsoft did not change all of the Windows code to 32-bit; parts of it remained 16-bit (albeit not directly using real mode) for reasons of compatibility, performance and development time. Additionally it was necessary to carry over design decisions from earlier versions of Windows for reasons of backwards compatibility, even if these design decisions no longer matched a more modern computing environment. These factors immediately began to impact the operating system's efficiency and stability.

Microsoft marketing adopted Windows 95 as the product name for Chicago when it was released on August 24, 1995.

Microsoft went on to release five different versions of Windows 95:

- Windows 95 – original release (RTM)
- Windows 95 A – included Windows 95 OSR1 slipstreamed into the installation.
- Windows 95 B – (OSR2) included several major enhancements, Internet Explorer (IE) 3.0 and full FAT32 file system support.
- Windows 95 B USB – (OSR2.1) included basic USB support.
- Windows 95 C – (OSR2.5) included all the above features, plus IE 4.0. This was the last 95 version produced.

OSR2, OSR2.1, and OSR2.5 ("OSR" being an initialism for "OEM Service Release") were not released to the general public, rather, they were available only to OEMs that would preload the OS onto computers. Some companies sold new hard drives with OSR2 preinstalled (officially justifying this as needed due to the hard drive's capacity).

The first Microsoft Plus! add-on pack was sold for Windows 95.

=== Windows 98 ===
Wordmark logo for Windows 98

On June 25, 1998, Microsoft released Windows 98, code-named "Memphis" during development. It included new hardware drivers and better support for the FAT32 file system which allows support for disk partitions larger than the 2 GB maximum accepted by Windows 95. The USB support in Windows 98 was more robust than the basic support provided by the OEM editions of Windows 95. It also introduces the controversial integration of the Internet Explorer 4 web browser into the Windows shell and File Explorer (then known as Windows Explorer at the time).

On June 10, 1999, Microsoft released Windows 98 Second Edition (also known as Windows 98 SE), an interim release whose notable features were the addition of Internet Connection Sharing and improved WDM audio and modem support. Internet Connection Sharing is a form of network address translation, allowing several machines on a LAN (Local Area Network) to share a single Internet connection. It also includes Internet Explorer 5 as opposed to Internet Explorer 4 in the original version. Windows 98 Second Edition also has certain improvements over the original release, and hardware support through device drivers was increased. Many minor problems present in the original release of Windows 98 were also found and fixed. These changes, among others, makes it (according to many) the most stable release of Windows 9x family—to the extent that some commentators used to say that Windows 98's beta version was more stable than Windows 95's final (gamma) version.

Like with Windows 95, Windows 98 received the Microsoft Plus! add-on in the form of Plus! 98.

=== Windows Me ===
Wordmark logo for Windows Me

On September 14, 2000, Microsoft introduced Windows Me (Millennium Edition; also known as Windows ME), which upgraded Windows 98 with enhanced multimedia and Internet features. Code-named "Millennium", It was conceived as a quick one-year project that served as a stopgap release between Windows 98 and Windows XP (then code-named Whistler at the time), as the Neptune project had been scrapped in favor of merging with Odyssey (a planned successor to Windows 2000) to create the Whistler project that eventually became Windows XP. It borrowed some features from the business-oriented Windows 2000 into the Windows 9x series such as the color scheme, system sounds and Web View layouts, and introduced the first version of System Restore, which allowed users to revert their system state to a previous "known-good" point in the case of a system failure. Windows Me also introduced the first release of Windows Movie Maker and included Windows Media Player 7. Internet Explorer 5.5 came shipped with Windows Me. Certain features of Windows Me were originally included as part of Microsoft Plus! 98 for Windows 98, such as the inclusion of compressed ZIP folders. Many of the new features from Windows Me were also available as updates for older Windows versions such as Windows 98 via Windows Update. The role of MS-DOS has also been greatly reduced compared to previous versions of Windows, with Windows Me no longer allowing real mode DOS to be accessed.

Windows Me initially gained a positive reception upon its release, but later on it was heavily criticized by users for its instability and unreliability, due to frequent freezes and crashes. Windows Me has been viewed by many as one of the worst operating systems of all time, both in critical and in retrospect. PC World was highly critical of Windows Me months after it was released (and indeed when it was no longer available), with their article infamously describing Windows Me as "Mistake Edition" and placing it 4th in their "Worst Tech Products of All Time" feature in 2006. Consequently, many home users that were affected by Windows Me's instabilities (as well as those who negatively viewed Windows Me) ultimately stuck with the more reliable Windows 98 Second Edition for the remainder of Windows Me's lifecycle until the release of Windows XP in 2001. A small number of Windows Me owners moved over to the business-oriented Windows 2000 Professional during that same time period.

The inability of users to easily boot into real mode MS-DOS like in Windows 95 and 98 led users to quickly figure out how to hack their Windows Me installations to provide this missing functionality back into the operating system.

Unlike Windows 95 and Windows 98, Windows Me did not receive a dedicated Microsoft Plus! add-on pack for it.

=== Decline ===
The release of Windows 2000 marked a shift in the user experience between the Windows 9x series and the Windows NT series. Windows NT 4.0, while based on the Windows 95 interface, suffered from a lack of support for USB, Plug and Play and DirectX versions after 3.0, preventing its users from playing contemporary games. Windows 2000 on the other hand, while primarily made towards business and server users, featured an updated user interface and better support for both Plug and Play and USB, as well as including built-in support for DirectX 7.0. The release of Windows XP in late 2001 confirmed the change of direction for Microsoft, bringing the consumer and business operating systems together under Windows NT. It also introduced a "compatibility mode" option, which allowed certain software to run as they would on earlier versions of Windows depending on the Windows version being used.

After the release of Windows XP, Microsoft stopped selling Windows 9x releases to end users (and later to OEMs) in the early 2000s. By March 2004, it was impossible to purchase any versions of the Windows 9x series.

=== End of support ===
Windows 95 exited mainstream support on December 31, 2000, with extended support ending a year later on December 31, 2001 (support for older Windows versions prior to Windows 95 also ended on the same day). Windows 98 and Windows 98 Second Edition had its mainstream support end on June 30, 2002, while mainstream support for Windows Me ended on December 31, 2003. Microsoft then continued to support the Windows 9x series until July 11, 2006, when extended support ended for Windows 98, Windows 98 Second Edition (SE), and Windows Millennium Edition (Me) – 4 years after support for Windows 95 ended in late 2001.

Microsoft DirectX, a set of standard gaming APIs, stopped being updated on Windows 95 at version 8.0a. It also stopped being updated on Windows 98 and Me after the release of Windows Vista in 2006, making DirectX 9.0c the last version of DirectX to support these operating systems.

Windows 95, Windows 98 and Windows Me also received no more security patches for Internet Explorer when the respective operating systems reached their end of support date. Internet Explorer 5.5 with Service Pack 2 is the last version of Internet Explorer compatible with Windows 95, while Internet Explorer 6 with Service Pack 1 is the last version compatible with latter releases of Windows 9x (i.e. 98 and Me). While Internet Explorer 6 for Windows XP did receive security patches up until it lost support, this is not the case for IE6 under Windows 98 and Me. Due to its age, Internet Explorer 7, the first major update to Internet Explorer 6 in half a decade, was only available for Windows XP SP2 and Windows Vista.

In 2011, Microsoft retired the Windows Update v4 website and removed the updates for Windows 98, Windows 98 SE, and Windows Me from its servers. Despite this, an independent project named Windows Update Restored was created in 2022 that aims to restore the Windows Update websites for older versions of Windows, including all releases of Windows 9x.

Microsoft announced in July 2019 that the Microsoft Internet Games services on Windows Me (and XP) ended on July 31, 2019 (and for Windows 7 on January 22, 2020).

== Design ==
=== Kernel ===
Windows 9x is a series of monolithic 16/32-bit operating systems.

Like most operating systems, Windows 9x consists of kernel space and user space memory. Although Windows 9x features some memory protection, it does not protect the first megabyte of memory from userland applications for compatibility reasons. This area of memory contains code critical to the functioning of the operating system, and by writing into this area of memory an application can crash or freeze the operating system. This was a source of instability as faulty applications could accidentally write into this region, potentially corrupting important operating system memory, which usually resulted in some form of system error and halt.

==== User mode ====
The user-mode parts of Windows 9x consist of three subsystems: the Win16 subsystem, the Win32 subsystem and MS-DOS.

Windows 9x/Me set aside two blocks of 64 KiB memory regions for GDI and heap resources. By running multiple applications, applications with numerous GDI elements or by running applications over a long span of time, it could exhaust these memory areas. If free system resources dropped below 10%, Windows would become unstable and likely crash.

==== Kernel mode ====
The kernel mode parts consist of the Virtual Machine Manager (VMM), the Installable File System Manager (IFSHLP), the Configuration Manager, and in Windows 98 and later, the WDM Driver Manager (NTKERN).

As a 32-bit operating system, virtual memory space is 4 GiB, divided into a lower 2 GiB for applications and an upper 2 GiB for kernel per process.

=== Registry ===
Like Windows NT, Windows 9x stores user-specific and configuration-specific settings in a large information database called the Windows registry. Hardware-specific settings are also stored in the registry, and many device drivers use the registry to load configuration data. Previous versions of Windows used files such as AUTOEXEC.BAT, CONFIG.SYS, WIN.INI, SYSTEM.INI and other files with an .INI extension to maintain configuration settings. As Windows became more complex and incorporated more features, .INI files became too unwieldy for the limitations of the then-current FAT filesystem. Backwards-compatibility with .INI files was maintained until Windows XP succeeded the 9x and NT lines.

Although Microsoft discourages using .INI files in favor of Registry entries, a large number of applications (particularly 16-bit Windows-based applications) still use .INI files. Windows 9x supports .INI files solely for compatibility with those applications and related tools (such as setup programs). The AUTOEXEC.BAT and CONFIG.SYS files also still exist for compatibility with real-mode system components and to allow users to change certain default system settings such as the PATH environment variable.

The registry consists of two files: User.dat and System.dat. In Windows Me, Classes.dat was added.

=== Virtual Machine Manager ===
The Virtual Machine Manager (VMM) is the 32-bit protected mode kernel at the core of Windows 9x. Its primary responsibility is to create, run, monitor and terminate MS-DOS, Win16 and Win32 virtual machines.

The VMM provides services that manage memory, processes, interrupts and protection faults. The VMM works with virtual devices (loadable kernel modules, which consist mostly of 32-bit ring 0 or kernel mode code, but may include other types of code, such as a 16-bit real mode initialization segment) to allow those virtual devices to intercept interrupts and faults to control the access that an application has to hardware devices and installed software. Both the VMM and virtual device drivers run in a single, 32-bit, flat model address space at privilege level 0 (also called ring 0). The VMM provides multi-threaded, preemptive multitasking. It runs multiple applications simultaneously by sharing CPU (central processing unit) time between the threads in which the applications and virtual machines run.

The VMM is also responsible for creating MS-DOS environments for system processes and Windows applications that still need to run in MS-DOS mode. It is the replacement for win386.exe in Windows 3.x, and the file vmm32.vxd is a compressed archive containing most of the core VxD, such as VMM.vxd itself and ifsmgr.vxd (which facilitates file system access without the need to call the real mode file system code of the DOS kernel).

=== Software support ===
==== Unicode ====
Windows 9x has no native support for Unicode encoding and only officially supports ANSI encoding. Partial Unicode support can be installed on Windows 9x via the Microsoft Layer for Unicode.

==== File systems ====
Windows 9x does not natively support NTFS or HPFS; however, there are third-party solutions available for Windows 9x that allows read-only access to NTFS volumes. Early versions of Windows 95 did not support FAT32.

Like Windows for Workgroups 3.11, Windows 9x provides support for 32-bit file access based on IFSHLP.SYS. Unlike Windows 3.x, Windows 9x has support for the VFAT file system, allowing file names with a maximum of 255 characters instead of having 8.3 filenames.

==== Event logging and tracing ====
Windows 9x has no support for event logging and tracing or error reporting that the Windows NT family of operating systems has, although software like Norton CrashGuard can be used to achieve similar capabilities on Windows 9x.

==== Security ====
Windows 9x is designed as a single-user system. Thus, the security model is much less effective than the one in Windows NT. One reason for this is the FAT file systems (including FAT12/FAT16/FAT32), which are the only ones that Windows 9x supports officially, though Windows NT also supports FAT12 and FAT16 (but not FAT32; which wouldn't be supported until Windows 2000) and Windows 9x can be extended to read and write NTFS volumes using third-party Installable File System drivers. FAT systems have very limited security; every user that has access to a FAT drive also has access to all files on that drive. The FAT file systems provide no access control lists and file-system level encryption like NTFS.

Some operating systems that were available at the same time as Windows 9x are either multi-user or have multiple user accounts with different access privileges, which allows important system files (such as the kernel image) to be immutable under most user accounts. In contrast, while Windows 95 and later operating systems offer the option of having profiles for multiple users, they have no concept of access privileges, making them roughly equivalent to a single-user, single-account operating system; this means that all processes can modify all files on the system that are not open, in addition to being able to modify the boot sector and perform other low-level hard drive modifications. This enables viruses and other clandestinely installed software to integrate themselves with the operating system in a way that is difficult for ordinary users to detect or undo. The profile support in the Windows 9x family is meant for convenience only; unless some registry keys are modified, the system can be accessed by pressing "Cancel" at login, even if all profiles have a password. Windows 95's default login dialog box also allows new user profiles to be created without having to log in first.

Users and software can render the operating system unable to function by deleting or overwriting important system files from the hard disk. Users and software are also free to change configuration files in such a way that the operating system is unable to boot or properly function. This phenomenon is not exclusive to Windows 9x; many other operating systems are also susceptible to these vulnerabilities, either by viruses, malware or by the user's consent.

Installation software often replaced and deleted system files without properly checking if the file was still in use or of a newer version. This created a phenomenon often referred to as DLL hell. Windows Me introduced System File Protection and System Restore to handle common problems caused by this issue.

==== Network sharing ====
Windows 9x offers share-level access control security for file and printer sharing as well as user-level access control if a Windows NT-based operating system is available on the network. In contrast, Windows NT-based operating systems offer only user-level access control but integrated with the operating system's own user account security mechanism.

=== Hardware support ===
==== Drivers ====
Device drivers in Windows 9x can be virtual device drivers or (starting with Windows 98) WDM drivers. VxDs usually have the filename extension .vxd or .386, whereas WDM compatible drivers usually use the extension .sys. The 32-bit VxD message server (msgsrv32) is a program that is able to load virtual device drivers (VxDs) at startup and then handle communication with the drivers. Additionally, the message server performs several background functions, including loading the Windows shell (such as Explorer.exe or Progman.exe).

Another type of device drivers are .DRV drivers. These drivers are New Executable format and are loaded in user-mode, and are commonly used to control devices such as multimedia devices. To provide access to these devices, a dynamic link library is required (such as MMSYSTEM.DLL).

Windows 9x retains backwards compatibility with many drivers made for Windows 3.x and MS-DOS. Using MS-DOS drivers can limit performance and stability due to their use of conventional memory and need to run in real mode which requires the CPU to switch in and out of protected mode.

Drivers written for Windows 9x are loaded into the same address space as the kernel. This means that drivers can by accident or design overwrite critical sections of the operating system. Doing this can lead to system crashes, freezes and disk corruption. Faulty operating system drivers were a source of instability for the operating system. Other monolithic and hybrid kernels, like Linux and Windows NT, are also susceptible to malfunctioning drivers impeding the kernel's operation.

Often the software developers of drivers and applications had insufficient experience with creating programs for the 'new' system, thus causing many errors which have been generally described as "system errors" by users, even if the error is not caused by parts of Windows or DOS. Microsoft has repeatedly redesigned the Windows Driver architecture since the release of Windows 95 as a result, starting with the Windows Driver Model (WDM) and later culminating into the Windows Driver Frameworks (WDF).

==== CPU and bus technologies ====
Windows 9x has no native support for hyper-threading, Data Execution Prevention, symmetric multiprocessing, APIC, or multi-core processors.

Windows 9x has no native support for SATA host bus adapters or USB drives (except for Windows Me). There are, however, many SATA-I controllers for which Windows 98/Me drivers exist, and USB mass storage support can be added to Windows 95 OSR2 and Windows 98 by third-party drivers. Hardware driver support for Windows 9x began to decline after the release of Windows XP in 2001, most notably with motherboard chipsets and video cards. By the mid-2000s, hardware driver support for Windows 9x was essentially nonexistent.

Early versions of Windows 95 had no support for USB, AGP acceleration, or Infrared support. Windows 95 had native support for ATAPI CD-ROMs.

=== MS-DOS ===
Windows 95 was able to reduce the role of MS-DOS in Windows much further than had been done in Windows 3.1x and earlier. According to Microsoft developer Raymond Chen, MS-DOS served two purposes in Windows 95: as the boot loader, and as the 16-bit legacy device driver layer.

When Windows 95 started up, MS-DOS loaded, processed CONFIG.SYS, launched COMMAND.COM, ran AUTOEXEC.BAT and finally ran WIN.COM. The WIN.COM program used MS-DOS to load the virtual machine manager, read SYSTEM.INI, load the virtual device drivers, and then turn off any running copies of EMM386 and switch into protected mode. Once in protected mode, the virtual device drivers (VxDs) transferred all state information from MS-DOS to the 32-bit file system manager, and then shut off MS-DOS. These VxDs allow Windows 9x to interact with hardware resources directly, as providing low-level functionalities such as 32-bit disk access and memory management. All future file system operations would get routed to the 32-bit file system manager. In Windows Me, win.com was no longer executed during the startup process; instead it went directly to execute VMM32.VXD from IO.SYS.

The second role of MS-DOS (as the 16-bit legacy device driver layer) was as a backward compatibility tool for running DOS programs in Windows. Many MS-DOS programs and device drivers interacted with DOS in a low-level way, for example, by patching low-level BIOS interrupts such as int 13h, the low-level disk I/O interrupt. When a program issued an int 21h call to access MS-DOS, the call would go first to the 32-bit file system manager, which would attempt to detect this sort of patching. If it detects that the program has tried to hook into DOS, it will jump back into the 16-bit code to let the hook run. A 16-bit driver called IFSMGR.SYS would previously have been loaded by CONFIG.SYS, the job of which was to hook MS-DOS first before the other drivers and programs got a chance, then jump from 16-bit code back into 32-bit code, when the DOS program had finished, to let the 32-bit file system manager continue its work. According to Windows developer Raymond Chen, "MS-DOS was just an extremely elaborate decoy. Any 16-bit drivers and programs would patch or hook what they thought was the real MS-DOS, but which was in reality just a decoy. If the 32-bit file system manager detected that somebody bought the decoy, it told the decoy to quack."

==== MS-DOS Virtualization ====
Windows 9x can run MS-DOS applications within itself using a method called "Virtualization", where an application is run on a Virtual DOS machine.

==== MS-DOS Mode ====
Windows 95 and Windows 98 also offer backwards compatibility for DOS applications in the form of being able to boot into a native "DOS Mode" (MS-DOS can be booted without booting Windows, but not putting the CPU in protected mode). Through Windows 9x's memory managers and other post-DOS improvements, the overall system performance and functionality is improved. Some old applications or games may not run properly in the virtual DOS environment within Windows and require real DOS Mode.

Having a command line mode outside of the GUI also offers the ability to fix certain system errors without entering the GUI. For example, if a virus is active in GUI mode it can often be safely removed in DOS mode, by deleting its files, which are usually locked while infected in Windows. Similarly, corrupted registry files, system files or boot files can be restored from real mode DOS.

Windows 95 and Windows 98 can also be started from DOS Mode by typing 'WIN' at the command prompt and then hitting "Enter", similar to earlier versions of Windows such as Windows 3.1.

=== User interface ===
Users can control a Windows 9x-based system through a command-line interface (or CLI) or a graphical user interface (or GUI). The default mode for Windows is usually the graphical user interface, whereas the CLI is available through MS-DOS windows. The GUI provides a means to control the placement and appearance of individual application windows, and interacts with the window system.

The GDI, which is a part of the Win32 and Win16 subsystems, is also a module that is loaded in user mode, unlike Windows NT where the GDI is loaded in kernel mode. Alpha compositing and therefore transparency effects, such as fade effects in menus, are not supported by the GDI in Windows 9x, unlike with Windows NT releases since Windows 2000.

The default user interface for the GUI is Windows Explorer; however, a variety of additional Windows shell replacements exist. Other GUIs include LiteStep, bbLean and Program Manager.

== In popular culture ==
The Windows 9x series of operating systems has been recognized in various forms of media, including parodies and retrospective reviews.

Several websites have been created to replicate an operating system as a whole, including the Windows 9x series, following its sheer popularity with many home users of its era. Many of these web-based projects (including the ones listed below) are designed to invoke nostalgia for users who have used such old computers, games and operating systems of the past, and as such are featured on several websites focusing on older versions of Windows and vintage computing.

Developed in 2014, Windows 93 (titled as "WINDOWS93" in the web browser) is a web-based parody site created by two French musicians and programmers who go by the names of jankenpopp and Zombectro. Being a parody of the Windows 9x series, it is purposefully designed to look and feel like an actual operating system. It features several web applications which reference and features various internet memes from the late 1990s up to the early 2000s.

In 2019, EmuOS was created, which is a web-based site designed to play retro games and applications within a web browser. It was created by Emupedia, a video game preservation and computer history community-based site. Like the aforementioned Windows 93 project, the site itself replicates the look and feel of Windows 9x as a whole to emulate an actual Windows operating system, featuring 3 themes based on all major Windows 9x releases starting from Windows 95 up to Windows Me. It also features the aforementioned Windows 93 parody site.

Windows 98 has been recreated in web-based format under the name 98.js (also known as Windows 98 Online). It is a simulation of Windows 98 in JavaScript format (hence the ".js" in the name), featuring web-based versions of several classic Windows applications.

== See also ==
- Comparison of operating systems
- Architecture of Windows 9x
- MS-DOS 7
