= IBMDOS.COM =

System file (DOS kernel) in PC DOS and DR-DOS

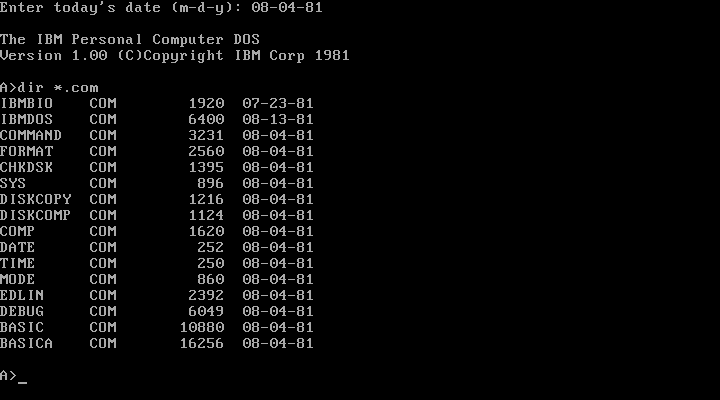
IBMDOS.COM (second in the list of COM files) in IBM PC DOS 1.0.

IBMDOS.COM is the filename of the IBM PC DOS and DR-DOS kernel. Loaded and initially invoked by the DOS BIOS in IBMBIO.COM during the boot process, it contains the hardware-independent parts of the operating system, including the embedded FAT12, FAT16 and, in newer versions, the FAT32 file system code, as well as the code to provide the DOS API to applications.

The file exists in PC DOS 1.0 to 7.10 and DR DOS 5.0 and higher (except for DR-DOS 7.06), with MS-DOS using MSDOS.SYS (from version 1.10 to 6.22) for the same purpose. DR DOS 3.31 to 3.41 used the equivalent DRBDOS.SYS file instead. (For compatibility purposes with some DOS applications the IBMDOS.COM file name was briefly also used by the IBM version of OS/2 1.0, where it resembled the OS2DOS.COM OS/2 kernel file as used by Microsoft.)

By default, the file is located in the root directory of the bootable drive/partition (normally C:\) and has the hidden, read-only, and system file attributes set. As IBMDOS.COM is a binary image containing executable code rather than a true COM-style program, the hidden attribute is set to keep the file from being accidentally invoked at the command prompt, which would lead to a crash. This is not necessary for DR-DOS 7.02 and higher, because under these systems the file is a fat binary also containing a tiny COM-style stub just displaying some version info and exiting gracefully when loaded inappropriately.

In Digital Research terminology, the kernel component of the operating system is called the BDOS (Basic Disk Operating System), a term originally coined by Gary Kildall in 1975 for CP/M, but which is continued to be used in all other DRI operating systems (except for Concurrent DOS 286 and FlexOS). Microsoft has used this name as well when referring to the kernel of the MSX-DOS operating system. The FAT file system specific code is called the FDOS in DRI terminology.

== See also ==
- IBMBIO.COM
- MSDOS.SYS
- List of DOS system files
