= COMMAND.COM =

Default command line for MS-DOS and Windows 9x

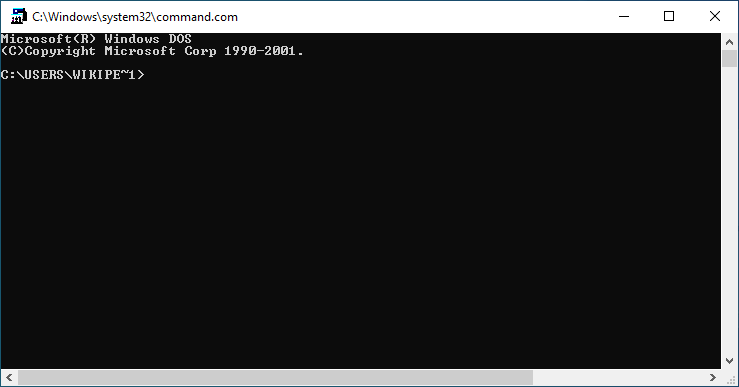
- COMMAND.COM in Windows 10
- Other names: MS-DOS Prompt, Windows Command Interpreter
- Developers: Seattle Computer Products, IBM, Microsoft, The Software Link, Datalight, Novell, Caldera
- Release: 1980; 46 years ago
- Written in: x86 assembly language
- Operating system: 86-DOS; MS-DOS; PC DOS; DR-DOS; SISNE plus; PTS-DOS; ROM-DOS; OS/2; Windows 9x; Windows NT (NTVDM); FreeDOS; MSX-DOS
- Platform: 16-bit x86
- Successor: cmd.exe
- Type: Command-line interpreter

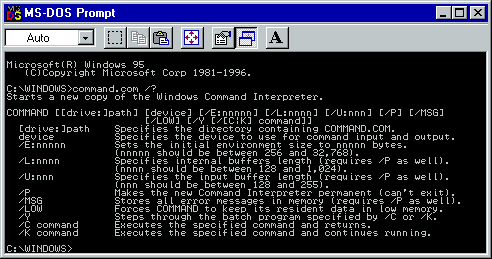
COMMAND.COM running in a Windows console on Windows 95 (MS-DOS Prompt)

COMMAND.COM is the default command-line interpreter for MS-DOS, Windows 95, Windows 98 and Windows Me. In the case of DOS, it is the default user interface as well. It has an additional role as the usual first program run after boot (init process). As a shell, COMMAND.COM has two distinct modes of operation: interactive mode and batch mode. Internal commands are commands stored directly inside the COMMAND.COM binary; thus, they are always available, but can only be executed directly from the command interpreter.

== Description ==
COMMAND.COM's successor on OS/2 and Windows NT systems is cmd.exe, although it is available in virtual DOS machines on IA-32 versions of those operating systems as well. The COMMAND.COM filename was also used by Disk Control Program (DCP), an MS-DOS derivative by the former East German VEB Robotron.

COMMAND.COM is a DOS program. Programs launched from it are DOS programs that use the DOS API to communicate with the disk operating system. The compatible command processor under FreeDOS is sometimes also called FreeCom.

== Operating modes ==
As a shell, COMMAND.COM has two distinct modes of operation. The first is interactive mode, in which the user types commands which are then executed immediately. The second is batch mode, which executes a predefined sequence of commands stored as a text file with the .BAT extension.

== Internal commands ==
Internal commands are commands stored directly inside the COMMAND.COM binary. Thus, they are always available but can only be executed directly from the command interpreter.

All commands are executed after the ↵ Enter key is pressed at the end of the line. COMMAND.COM is not case-sensitive, meaning commands can be typed in any mixture of upper and lower case.

BREAK
Controls the handling of program interruption with Ctrl+C or Ctrl+Break.
CHCP
Displays or changes the current system code page.
CHDIR, CD
Changes the current working directory or displays the current directory.
CLS
Clears the screen.
COPY
Copies one file to another (if the destination file already exists, MS-DOS asks whether to replace it). (See also XCOPY, an external command that could also copy directory trees).
CTTY
Defines the device to use for input and output.
DATE
Display and set the date of the system.
DEL, ERASE
Deletes a file. When used on a directory, deletes all files inside the directory only. In comparison, the external command DELTREE deletes all subdirectories and files inside a directory as well as the directory itself.
DIR
Lists the files in the specified directory.
ECHO
Toggles whether the commands executed by a batch file are displayed on screen (ECHO ON) or not (ECHO OFF). Also displays text on the screen (ECHO text).
EXIT
Exits from COMMAND.COM and returns to the program which launched it.
LFNFOR
Enables or disables the return of long filenames by the FOR command. (Windows 9x).
LOADHIGH, LH
Loads a program into upper memory (HILOAD in DR DOS).
LOCK
Enables external programs to perform low-level disk access to a volume. (MS-DOS 7.1 and Windows 9x only)
MKDIR, MD
Creates a new directory.
PATH
Displays or changes the value of the PATH environment variable which controls the places where COMMAND.COM will search for executable files.
PROMPT
Displays or change the value of the PROMPT environment variable which controls the appearance of the prompt.
RENAME, REN
Renames a file or directory.
RMDIR, RD
Removes an empty directory.
SET
Sets the value of an environment variable; without arguments, shows all defined environment variables.
TIME
Display and set the time of the system.
TRUENAME
Display the fully expanded physical name of a file, resolving ASSIGN, JOIN and SUBST logical filesystem mappings.
TYPE
Display the content of a file on the console.
UNLOCK
Disables low-level disk access. (MS-DOS 7.1 and Windows 9x only)
VER
Displays the version of the operating system.
VERIFY
Enable or disable verification of writing for files.
VOL
Shows information about a volume.

=== Batch file commands ===
Control structures are mostly used inside batch files, although they can also be used interactively.

:label
Defines a target for GOTO.
CALL
Executes another batch file and returns to the old one and continues.
FOR
Iteration: repeats a command for each out of a specified set of files.
GOTO
Moves execution to a specified label. Labels are specified at the beginning of a line, with a colon (:likethis).
IF
Conditional statement, allows branching of the program execution.
PAUSE
Halts execution of the program and displays a message asking the user to press any key to continue.
REM
comment: any text following this command is ignored.
SHIFT
Replaces each of the replacement parameters with the subsequent one (e.g. %0 with %1, %1 with %2, etc.).

==== IF command ====
On exit, all external commands submit a return code (a value between 0 and 255) to the calling program. Most programs have a certain convention for their return codes (for instance, 0 for a successful execution).

If a program was invoked by COMMAND.COM, the internal IF command with its ERRORLEVEL conditional can be used to test on error conditions of the last invoked external program.

Under COMMAND.COM, internal commands do not establish a new value.

== Variables ==
Batch files for COMMAND.COM can have four kinds of variables:

- Environment variables: These have the %VARIABLE% form and are associated with values with the SET statement. Before DOS 3 COMMAND.COM will only expand environment variables in batch mode; that is, not interactively at the command prompt.
- Replacement parameters: These have the form %0, %1...%9, and initially contain the command name and the first nine command-line parameters passed to the script (e.g., if the invoking command was myscript.bat John Doe, then %0 is "myscript.bat", %1 is "John" and %2 is "Doe"). The parameters to the right of the ninth can be mapped into range by using the SHIFT statement.
- Loop variables: Used in loops, they have the %%a format when run in batch files. These variables are defined solely within a specific FOR statement, and iterate over a certain set of values defined in that FOR statement.
- Under Novell DOS 7, OpenDOS 7.01, DR-DOS 7.02 and higher, COMMAND.COM also supports a number of system information variables, a feature earlier found in 4DOS 3.00 and higher as well as in Multiuser DOS, although most of the supported variable names differ.

== Redirection, piping, and chaining ==
Because DOS is a single-tasking operating system, piping is achieved by running commands sequentially, redirecting to and from temporary files. In DOS 2, pipe creates 2 temporary files: \%PIPE1.$$$ (input), and \%PIPE2.$$$ (output) (they get swapped after each command). COMMAND.COM makes no provision for redirecting the standard error channel.

command < filename
Redirect standard input from a file or device
command > filename
Redirect standard output, overwriting target file if it exists.
command >> filename
Redirect standard output, appending to target file if it exists.
command1 | command2
Pipe standard output from command1 to standard input of command2
command1 ¶ command2
Commands separated by ASCII-20 (¶, invoked by Ctrl+T) are executed in sequence (chaining of commands). In other words, first command1 is executed until termination, then command2. This is an undocumented feature in COMMAND.COM of MS-DOS/PC DOS 5.0 and higher. It is also supported by COMMAND.COM of the Windows NT family as well as by DR-DOS 7.07. All versions of DR-DOS COMMAND.COM already supported a similar internal function utilizing an exclamation mark (!) instead (a feature originally derived from Concurrent DOS and Multiuser DOS) - in the single-user line this feature was only available internally (in built-in startup scripts like "!DATE!TIME") and indirectly through DOSKEY's $T parameter to avoid problems with ! as a valid filename character. 4DOS supports a configurable command line separator (4DOS.INI CommandSep= or SETDOS /C), which defaults to ^. COMMAND.COM in newer versions of Windows NT also supports an & separator for compatibility with the cmd syntax in OS/2 and the Windows NT family. (cmd does not support the ¶ separator.)

== Limitations ==
Generally, the command line length in interactive mode is limited to 126 characters. In MS-DOS 6.22, the command line length in interactive mode is limited to 127 characters.

== In popular culture ==
- The message "Loading COMMAND.COM" can be seen on a HUD view of the Terminator and the internal viewport of RoboCop when he reboots.
- In the animated children's TV series ReBoot, which takes place inside computers, the leader of a system (the equivalent of a city) is called the COMMAND.COM.

== See also ==
- List of DOS commands
- Comparison of command shells
- cmd.exe — command-line interpreter in various Windows and OS/2 systems
  - IBMBIO.COM
  - IO.SYS
  — starts the command processor as the first process
- SHELL (CONFIG.SYS directive) — to override default command processor
- COMSPEC (environment variable) — set by COMMAND.COM to reload transient portion of itself
- CMDLINE (environment variable) — set by COMMAND.COM to pass long command lines to external programs
  - 4DOS
  - NDOS
  — third-party replacement command processors
- DOSSHELL / ViewMAX — alternative DOS shells
  - Concurrent DOS
  - Multiuser DOS
  - REAL/32
  — have similar command processors not named COMMAND.COM
- PC-MOS/386 — has a similar command processor also named COMMAND.COM
- Transient Program Area — memory available for use either by the running application or the transient portion of COMMAND.COM
- SpartaDOS X — a similar implementation for Atari computers
- PowerShell
