= MSDOS.SYS =

System file (DOS kernel) in MS-DOS and configuration file in Windows 9x

MSDOS.SYS is a system file in MS-DOS and Windows 9x operating systems. In versions of MS-DOS from 1.1x through 6.22, the file comprises the MS-DOS kernel and is responsible for file access and program management. MSDOS.SYS is loaded by the DOS BIOS IO.SYS as part of the boot procedure. In some OEM versions of MS-DOS, the file is named MSDOS.COM.

In Windows 95 (MS-DOS 7.0) through Windows ME (MS-DOS 8.0), the DOS kernel has been combined with the DOS BIOS into a single file, IO.SYS (aka WINBOOT.SYS), while MSDOS.SYS became a plain text file containing boot configuration directives instead. If a WINBOOT.INI file exists, the system will retrieve these configuration directives from WINBOOT.INI rather than from MSDOS.SYS. When Windows 9x is installed over a preexisting DOS install, the Windows file may be temporarily named MSDOS.W40 for as long as Windows' dual-boot feature has booted the previous OS. Likewise, the MSDOS.SYS of the older system is named MSDOS.DOS for as long as Windows 9x is active.

Some DOS utilities expect the MSDOS.SYS file to have a minimal file size of at least 1 KiB. This is the reason why a large dummy comment is typically found in the MSDOS.SYS configuration file since Windows 95. (Note: The dummy comment in unmodified copies of MSDOS.SYS explains these reasons explicitly: The following lines are required for compatibility with other programs. Do not remove them (MSDOS.SYS needs to be >1024 bytes).)

By default, the file is located in the root directory of the bootable drive/partition (normally C:\ for hard disks) and has the hidden, read-only, and system file attributes set.

The MS-DOS derivative Disk Control Program (DCP) by the former East-German VEB Robotron used a DCDOS.SYS filename instead.

IBM PC DOS as well as DR-DOS since 5.0 (with the exception of DR-DOS 7.06) used the file IBMDOS.COM for the same purpose, whereas DR DOS 3.31 to 3.41 used DRBDOS.SYS instead. FreeDOS uses the file KERNEL.SYS for the same purpose.

Windows NT-based operating systems (NT 3.1–4, 2000, XP, and 2003) use the NTLDR file and NT 6+ operating systems (Vista, Server 2008, 2012, 2016, 2019, 2022, 2025, 7, 8, 8.1, 10 and 11) use bootmgr instead, as they have a different boot sequence.

== See also ==
- IO.SYS
- IBMDOS.COM
- COMMAND.COM
- List of DOS system files
- Architecture of Windows 9x
