= Title (command) =

Command of command line interpreters

title
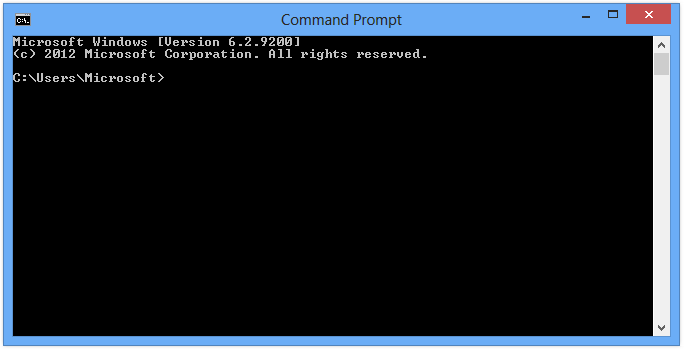
- Windows Command Prompt displaying the default title
- Developers: Microsoft, JP Software, ReactOS Contributors
- Operating system: Windows, ReactOS
- Platform: Cross-platform
- Type: Command
- License: Windows, TCC: Proprietary commercial software ReactOS: GPL v2

In computing, title is a command in various command-line interpreters (shells) on Microsoft Windows and ReactOS that changes the title for the graphical terminal emulator window. The command is also used within DFS and ADFS to change the title of the disc in the current drive.

== Overview ==
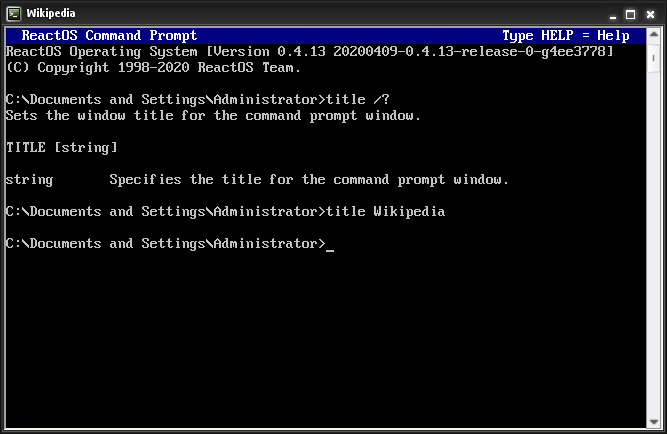
Screenshot of the ReactOS console window after the title was changed to "Wikipedia" using the title command

In case of Microsoft Windows it is a shell builtin of the command-line interpreter cmd.exe. The command is available in Windows 2000 and later. It is compatible with Windows Console and Windows Terminal.

The default window title is defined in the %COMSPEC% environment variable. However, since the Windows Console title can also be defined in the program shortcut, the title is usually set to "Command Prompt".

The command is also available in the Command Processor Shell of Windows Embedded CE and in the Take Command Console.

Although the OS/2 command shell is closely related to the Windows Command Prompt, the title command is not available in the OS/2 version of cmd.exe. The default title of the OS/2 shell window is "OS/2 Window". It can be changed using the start command.

The ReactOS Command Prompt also includes the title command to set the window title for the command prompt window.

The command also is not available in the macOS Terminal. Instead, the echo command can be used in combination with special escape sequences.

Within the GNU GRUB command processor title is one of several menu-specific commands. It is used to start a new boot entry.

== Syntax ==
title [<String>]

Arguments:

- <String> Specifies the title of the Command Prompt window.

== Example ==
The following batch file changes the title of the Command Prompt window to "Updating files" while the copy command is being executed. After the command is executed, the text "Files updated" is displayed using the echo command, and the title of the Command Prompt window is changed back to "Command Prompt".

@echo off
title Updating files
copy \\server\share\*.txt c:\documents\*.txt
echo Files updated
title Command Prompt

== See also ==
- Windows Console
- Linux console
