= Working directory =

Default directory for file-system operations

In computing, the working directory is the directory of a file system to which a relative path (Note: such as a Unix path that does not begin with slash (/) or a Windows path that does not begin with backslash (\)) is relative.

In a command-line environment, a user often uses files in or relative to the working directory. The system state that identifies the working directory provides a convenient way to define the context of work. Users can use paths that are conceptually simpler and usually shorter, instead of always using absolute paths. For example, for working directory /home/user/data on a Unix-like system, the file name foo.txt (a relative path) refers to absolute path /home/user/data/foo.txt. System state for working directory often also applies in a graphical user interface (GUI), but often is not useful since the GUI environment maintains directory context in a different way.

As a feature, working directories vary by environment yet have some common, typical attributes. Typically, each process has a separate working directory, which allows users to have a different working directory for each shell running on the operating system. Although common in systems that provide a hierarchical file system, the working directory feature is not required; for example, the DX10 operating system does not provide it, as all pathnames are either absolute or relative to the system volume.

Alternate names include current working directory (CWD) (Note: as used in the command getcwd.) and just current directory.

== Use ==
Change directory
Many shells provide a cd command for setting the working directory. Some systems provide a command with a different name. For example, chdir is an alternate name for cd in DOS/Windows.

Report
Commands for reporting the working directory vary more than setting it. Typically, a Unix shell provides the command pwd (short for print working directory) that reports the absolute path to the working directory. The equivalent command in DOS/Windows is cd without arguments. Using cd without arguments in Unix-like systems generally sets the working directory to the user's home directory.

Scripting
To ease scripting development, some shells provide a variable that contains the working-directory path. Typically, a Unix-like shell provides an environment variable named PWD. Windows shells COMMAND.COM and cmd.exe provide a pseudo-environment variable named CD. Shells 4DOS, 4OS2, and 4NT provide _CWD, _CWDS, _CWP, and _CWPS

Windows shortcut
A Windows file shortcut can point to a working directory to be used when activating the shortcut's target.

Command-line prompt
The working directory is displayed by the $P (Note: In the same way as $O works as alternative to $P under DR-DOS COMMAND.COM, $W has an alias $Y except for that it gets suppressed on floppies in order to avoid critical error messages or delays when trying to retrieve the path of a non-inserted floppy.) token of the DOS prompt command. To keep the prompt short in a deep directory, the DR-DOS 7.07 COMMAND.COM supports a $W token to display only the deepest subdirectory level. So, where a default PROMPT $P$G would result f.e. in C:\DOS> or C:\DOS\DRDOS>, a PROMPT $N:$W$G would instead yield C:DOS> and C:DRDOS>, respectively. A similar facility (using $W and $w) was added to 4DOS as well.

State for each DOS drive
Under DOS, the absolute path to the working directory for each logical volume is stored as the current directory structure (CDS). It is allocated at boot time with a slot for each logical drive (or as defined by LASTDRIVE). This structure imposes a length-limit of 66 characters on the full path of each working directory, and thus implicitly also limits the maximum possible depth of subdirectories.

DOS Plus and older issues of DR DOS (up to DR DOS 6.0, with BDOS 6.7 in 1991) had no such limitation due to their implementations using DOS emulation on top of a Concurrent DOS- (and thus CP/M-86-)derived kernel, which internally organized subdirectories as relative links to parent directories instead of as absolute paths. Since PalmDOS (with BDOS 7.0) and DR DOS 6.0 (1992 update with BDOS 7.1) and higher switched to use a CDS for maximum compatibility with DOS programs as well, they faced the same limitations as present in other DOSes.

High-level language access
Most programming-language environments provide an application programming interface to the file system for getting and setting the working directory.

The POSIX-defined function chdir() (accessible via C and the many languages that interoperate with it) is a system call that changes the working directory. Its argument is a text string that is a path to the target directory, either absolute or relative to the existing value.

Visual Basic provides the same functionality via a function with the same name.

In Java, the working directory can be obtained via the java.nio.file.Path interface, or the java.io.File class. The working directory cannot be changed.

== Examples ==
COMMAND.COM in DR-DOS 7.02 and higher provides ECHOS, a variant of the ECHO command that omits the terminating linefeed. This can be used to create a temporary batchjob storing the working directory in an environment variable like CD for later use. For example:

ECHOS SET CD=> SETCD.BAT
CHDIR >> SETCD.BAT
CALL SETCD.BAT
DEL SETCD.BAT

Alternatively, under Multiuser DOS and DR-DOS 7.02 and higher, various internal and external commands support a parameter /B (for "Batch"). This modifies the output of commands to become suitable for direct command-line input (when redirecting it into a batch file) or usage as a parameter for other commands (using it as input for another command). Where CHDIR would issue a directory path like C:\DOS, a command like CHDIR /B would issue CHDIR C:\DOS instead, so that CHDIR /B > RETDIR.BAT would create a temporary batchjob allowing returning to this directory later on.

== See also ==
- chroot – Shell command and system call that changes the apparent root directory
- Home directory – Directory to hold files for a specific user
- Load drive – Alphabetical assignment to logical drives on computers (e.g., C:\)
- Long filename – Extension of the 8.3 file naming scheme
- Root directory – First or top-most directory in a hierarchy
