= Move (command) =

Shell command for moving files

move
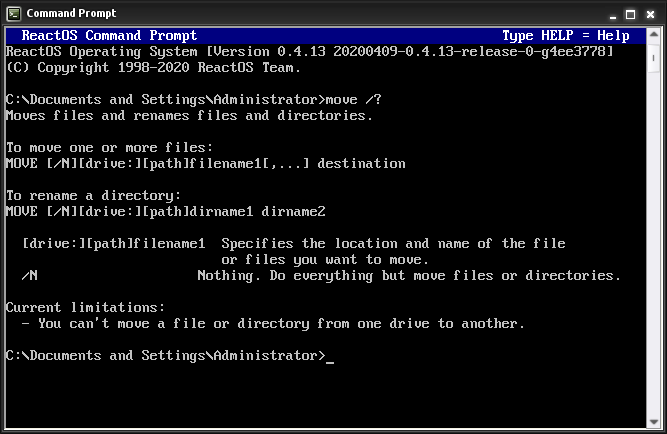
- The ReactOS move command
- Developers: Microsoft, IBM, JP Software, DR, Novell, Joe Cosentino, ReactOS Contributors
- Written in: FreeDOS, ReactOS: C
- Operating system: MS-DOS, PC DOS, MSX-DOS, OS/2, eComStation, ArcaOS, Windows, DR DOS, FreeDOS, ReactOS
- Platform: Cross-platform
- Type: Command
- License: FreeDOS, ReactOS: GPLv2

move is a shell command for renaming and moving files and directories.

The command is in various shells including COMMAND.COM, Command Prompt, 4DOS/4NT. In PowerShell, move is a predefined command alias for the Move-Item Cmdlet which serves the same essential purpose.

The command is available in various operating systems including DOS, OS/2, Windows and ReactOS. On MS-DOS, the command is available in versions 6 and later. The FreeDOS version was developed by Joe Cosentino. DR DOS 6.0 includes an implementation of the move command. The open-source MS-DOS emulator DOSBox has no MOVE command. Instead, the REN command can be used to move files.

The command is analogous to the Unix-based mv command and to the OpenVOS move_file and move_dircommands.

== Options ==
- /y – Suppress prompting to confirm overwriting an existing destination file
- /-y – Prompt to confirm overwriting an existing destination file

By default, the command prompts to overwrite unless executed in a batch script. The default can be modified by including the /y option in the COPYCMD environment variable. Then, that can be overridden via the /-y command-line option.

== Examples ==
The following command renames a file or directory foo to bar if bar is not an existing directory. If it is an existing directory, then foo is moved into bar and is then at path bar\foo.

> move foo bar

== See also ==
- List of DOS commands
- List of POSIX commands
