= Rpix86 =

rpix86
- Developer: Patrick Aalto
- Stable release: 0.19 / June 28, 2015; 11 years ago
- Type: DOS emulator
- License: Freeware
- Website: rpix86.patrickaalto.com

rpix86 is a DOS emulator for the Raspberry Pi created by Patrick Aalto. rpix86 emulates an Intel 80486 x86 CPU running at 20MHz with 640kB of memory, 256-color Super VGA graphics at 640x480, and a Sound Blaster 2.0 sound card. The latest version is 0.19, which was released in June 2015.

rpix86 does not have an inbuilt command-line interpreter. The user needs to have a DOS program that provides the command shell features. Currently the only supported shell is 4DOS version 7.50.

== See also ==
- DOSBox
- Virtual DOS machine
