= Double Commander =

Orthodox file manager

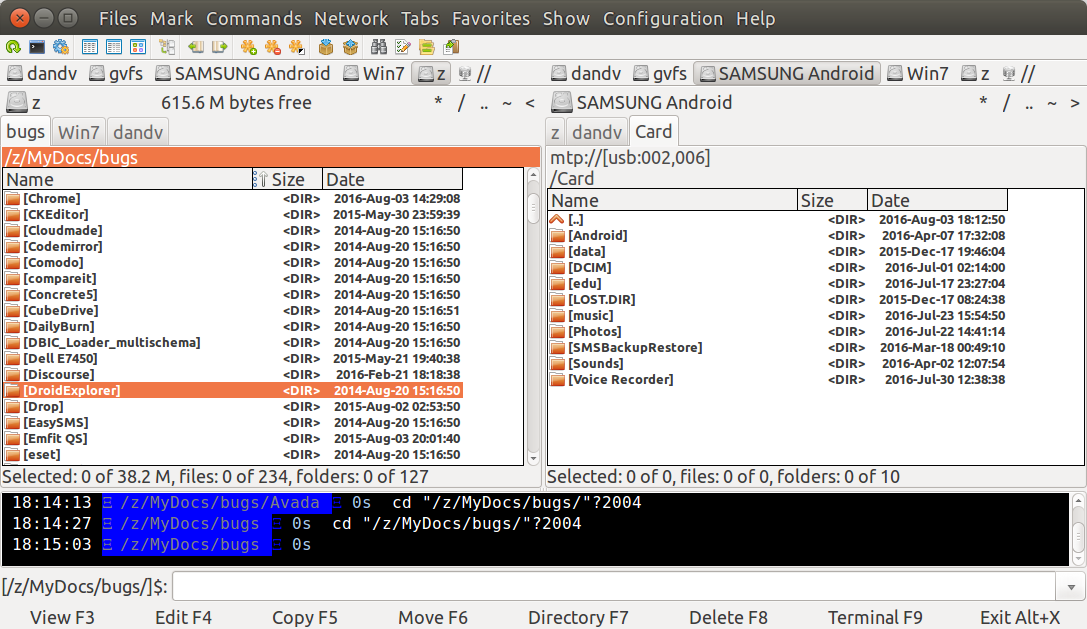
- Screenshot of Double Commander v0.7.2 running on Ubuntu 16.04
- Developers: Alexander Koblov and others
- Release: First Alpha December 26, 2007; 18 years ago
- Stable release: 1.2.9 / 27 September 2026
- Written in: Object Pascal (Free Pascal/Lazarus)
- Operating system: Windows, Linux, Mac OS X, Unix, BSD
- Size: 8.2 to 11.5 MB
- Type: File manager
- License: GPL-2.0-or-later
- Website: doublecmd.sourceforge.net
- Repository: github.com/doublecmd/doublecmd

Double Commander is a dual-pane file manager. It is a piece of free and open-source software licensed under the terms of the GNU General Public License. It is designed to be operated by a keyboard, a mouse, or by both at the same time.

It has support for tabs, bookmarks, customizable keyboard shortcuts, compressed files, checksums, and custom file list colors.

The default keyboard shortcuts and default functionality are inspired by the Total Commander for Microsoft Windows only. This makes it similar in operation to the original Norton Commander for DOS, which popularized the basic concept in the 1990s. It is a modern application, designed for use with the latest operating systems.

== Design ==
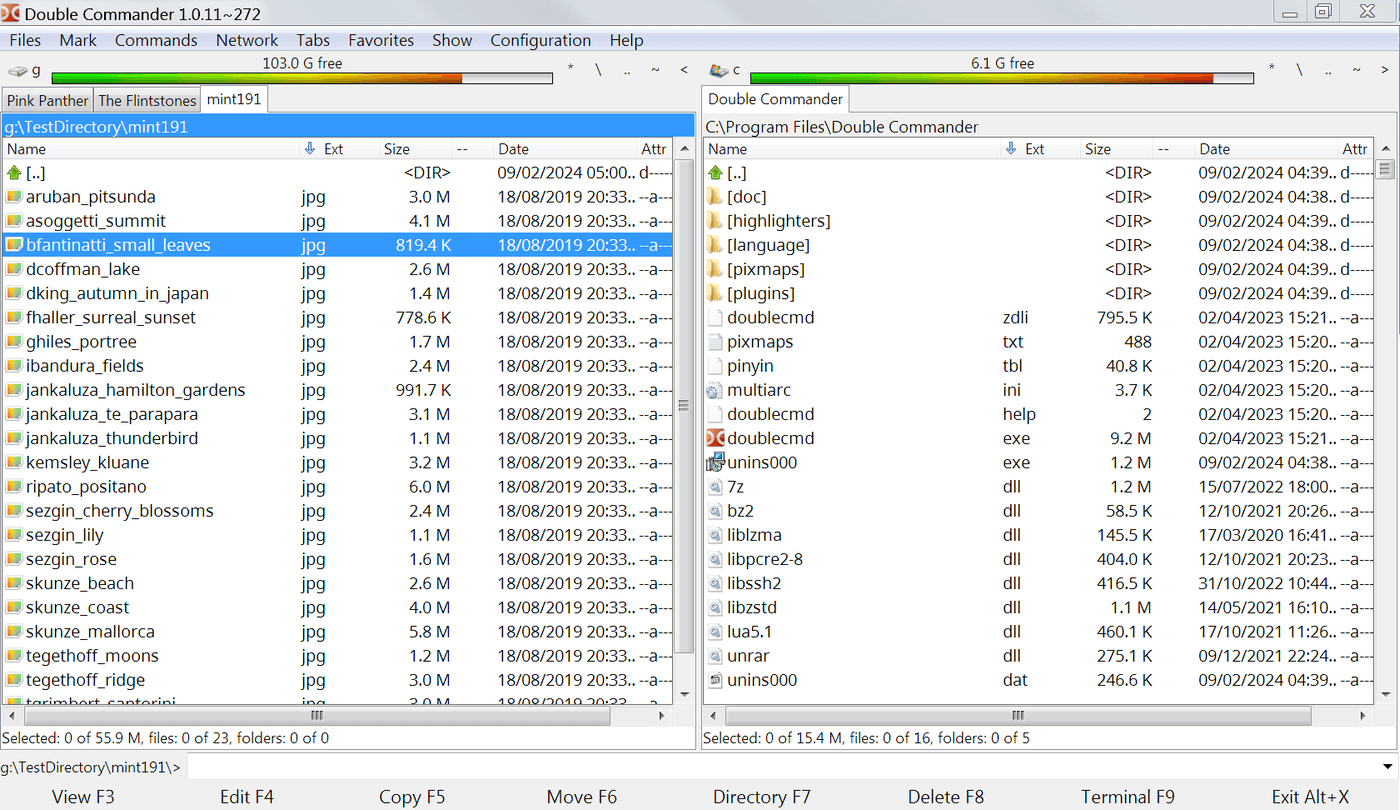
Double Commander 1.0.11 running on Windows, configured for a plain look

The basic concept of operation traces its roots to the popular Norton Commander for DOS. While Double Commander can be operated by mouse just like other modern file managers, it also enables easy operation by keyboard only, like its conceptual predecessors did.

Double Commander is designed for extensive customizability. For example, many of its toolbars can be toggled, configured in detail, its color scheme can be changed, and keyboard shortcuts can be modified.

The usability of a dual-pane file manager depends on it providing an extensive amount of commonly desired functionality and features, and on quality of implementation of those functionalities and features. Double Commander attempts to provide a large number of well-implemented features.

== Features ==
Double Commander has all the basic functionalities of a common dual-pane file manager. Those include the copy, move, rename and delete operations applied on individual files or directories, or the same operations applied on a selection of files and/or directories. Additional features that are not always present in other similar file managers are given in the following list.

- Customizable keyboard shortcuts: Includes an ability to assign multiple shortcuts for the same action.
- Directory bookmarks: Dubbed "Directory Hotlist". A shortcut key opens a bookmark selection dialogue, which can be used to quickly select a frequently used location.
- Archive support (zip, 7z, tar, bz2, tbz, gz, tgz, lzma, tlz): Allows existing archives to be browsed, new archives to be created from a selection of files, files to be extracted from existing archives, and files to be added to existing archives.
- Unicode support: Supports file names written in all of the world's major writing systems.
- Tabbed panels interface: Multiple locations in the filesystem are made quickly available by switching through open tabs.
- File search tool: Various search options include regular expressions and search for duplicates.
- Directory size calculator: Triggered by pressing the space key when the selection line is over a directory.
- File checksums creation and verification: Multiple algorithms are supported, including the SHA and BLAKE series.
- File viewer: Views files in a text, binary, hex, or decimal format.
- Text editor with syntax highlighting.
- Directory compare: Directories (all or only selected) can be compared and synchronized both symmetrically (two-way) and asymmetrically (one-way). This feature shows differences between two locations by directory and subdirectory, and can make a fully automatic backup of files that have been added, changed or deleted.
- List view ordering: Several sorting options.
- File icons and thumbnails: Images can also be viewed as thumbnails of user-defined sizes.
- Copy-paste and drag-and-drop support: Allows files and directories to be copied from/to other file managers.
- Background operations: All operations can be queued in the background.
- File wipe: Files can be wiped securely.
- Transparent archive handling: Files (and folders) in archives are handled as if they were in an ordinary disk partition. All decompression and compression processes work in the background.
- File comparison tool: Visual file comparison, difference and merge operations. While comparing, both files can be edited and saved, also in binary mode.
- Multi-rename tool: May be used for renaming a group of files and folders. Supports regular expressions and flat view, which allows renaming files in subfolders
- HTML file viewer: HTML files are displayed in a simple offline browser, provided by an attached plugin.
- File comments tool: A mechanism for creating, maintaining and displaying file comments (4DOS descript.ion).
- Plug-in support: Supports Total Commander WCX, WDX, WFX and WLX Windows plug-ins.
- Portable versions: Officially released portable versions are available for Windows, Linux, and FreeBSD.

== See also ==
- Comparison of file managers
- Total Commander
- Orthodox file managers
