= Long filename =

Extension of the 8.3 file naming scheme

Long filename (LFN) support is Microsoft's backward-compatible extension of the 8.3 filename (short filename) naming scheme used in MS-DOS. Long filenames can be more descriptive, including longer filename extensions such as .jpeg, .tiff, and .html that are common on other operating systems, rather than specialized shortened names such as .jpg, .tif, or .htm. The standard has been common with File Allocation Table (FAT) filesystems since its first implementation in Windows NT 3.5 of 1994.

To maintain compatibility with older operating systems, Microsoft formulated a method of generating an 8.3 filename from the long filename (for example, Microsoft.txt to MICROS~1.TXT) and associating it with the file.

== Compatibility issues ==
Microsoft implemented support for LFNs in the FAT filesystem by using hidden directory entries, of the volume label type, to store the longer names; this scheme is known as VFAT, and was chosen for compatibility, as volume labels are generally ignored by programs and operating system (OS) components. Programs running on older OSs could still access the files' short names, while newer, LFN-aware OSs and programs could use the longer ones.

When LFN support was first introduced into a DOS-based operating system in the form of Windows 95, it caused some problems for older programs. For example, a DOS program performing sector-level directory operations while Windows was in DOS mode could destroy long filename information so, by default, sector-level access to hard disks was disallowed in this mode.

Upon booting into plain DOS, the long filenames are not visible unless a VFAT LFN driver is installed. Microsoft did not add LFN support to many of its older programs, including File Manager, the Windows 3.1x (Windows for Workgroups) file manager that was made obsolete by the new operating system shell, Windows Explorer. Windows NT supported LFNs on NTFS file systems starting with the release of NT 3.1, and all of its utilities, including File Manager, were updated to support LFNs. NT 3.5 added FAT LFN support in preparation for Windows 95. However, the Windows 95 version of File Manager came from Windows for Workgroups 3.11.

OS/2 stores LFNs for FAT filesystems in .LONGNAME extended attributes that are incompatible with Microsoft's implementation and only visible to tools supporting OS/2's standard. Many APIs providing access to files by pathname cannot see the new, longer names without a supporting driver.

=== Limits ===
Because the FAT LFN implementation is layered atop an older, more limited naming system, there are inevitable complications, such as if an attempt is made to create too many files with the same first six letters. Also, one is more likely to encounter issues creating files or folders in the root directory, since FAT12 and FAT16 only allocate space for 512 root directory entries on hard disks. Since long filenames use more than one directory entry, this problem may occur with fewer than 512 files or folders in the root directory. There is space only for 24 long filenames of maximum length (512/(1+20)). This problem does not exist for FAT32 volumes.

The long filename system allows a maximum length of 255 UCS-2 characters including spaces and non-alphanumeric characters (excluding the following characters, which have special meaning within the COMMAND.COM command interpreter or the operating system kernel: \ / : * ? " < > |). This is achieved by chaining up to 20 directory entries of 13 2-byte Unicode characters each. The maximum length of a pathname is 256 characters, which includes all parent directories and the filename. 255-character mixed-case long filename is possible only for files, or folders with no sub-folders, at the root folder of any drive.

While long filename support allows for longer file and directory names, under DOS-based systems, the absolute file path constructed from the associated short file and directory name equivalents is still represented in an internal data structure called the Current Directory Structure (CDS), which imposes a limit of 66 characters on the (short) path name and thereby indirectly limits also the path depth to a maximum of 33 levels (counting in the root directory and assuming only single-letter names). (This design limitation was not present in older versions of DR DOS (prior to DR DOS 6.0 November 1991 updates) which still utilized a relative path representation internally, however, due to their internal differences these versions are not compatible with existing LFN add-on drivers.) Non-DOS-based operating systems without a CDS are not restricted to this path depth limitation.

== VFAT LFN drivers ==
The following is a list of drivers that can be used to provide support for VFAT long file names as used in Windows 95. Although drivers such as DOSLFN can be loaded in almost any versions of DOS, it works best on DOS versions that have support for LFN themselves, such as MS-DOS 7.10 or DR-DOS 7.02, so that DOS commands such as DIR would show long file names as well.

OS	Driver name	Provider
any plain DOS	DOSLFN, LFNDOS	third-party
DR-DOS	LONGNAME	included
RxDOS	built-in	included
OS/2	VFAT-OS2.IFS	third-party
Windows NT 4.0	NTLFN	third-party

== Driver-less real mode DOS LFN commands ==
Some small real mode DOS programs have also been written over the years, although many have been lost over time. One notable collection of programs that still exists is LFN Tools, which is open source and comprises seven useful LFN commands written in C++ and assembly language, with documentation included in English and German, and is available at LFNTOOLS on Sourceforge.net.

== Other implementations ==
Before LFN support was implemented into the FAT family of file systems, various file managers provided their own methods to attach and maintain longer file descriptions. Among the first to do so are the alternative command line processors 4DOS and NDOS with their internal DESCRIBE command and corresponding DESCRIPT.ION files. The latter are optional hidden files located in each directory storing a line-based list of file names located in the directory together with their textual description and optional metadata entries—for example, extended attributes and configuration data for other programs. The descriptions can be up to 511 characters long and are displayed along the file names in much the same way as long file names are listed alongside their short filename aliases in DIR listings. If an entry exists for a file, it will be copied and moved with the file for as long as these command line processors are used to perform the operation. This scheme is still maintained by successors such as 4OS2, 4NT / Take Command. It was adopted also by various other programs like Volkov Commander (VC), DOS Navigator (DN), Open DOS Navigator (ODN), Necromancer's DOS Navigator (NDN), Windows Commander, Total Commander, Double Commander, 7-Zip, XnView, ACDSee, Newsbin Pro, V, FreeDOS and some CUI_LIB-based applications.

Human68K, the operating system of the X68000 computers since 1986, is based on an extended FAT file system. It allows up to 18.3 characters in a filename (instead of the 8.3 in FAT) and allows also upper and lower case characters (as well as Kanji in Shift JIS code) that are all treated as distinctive. If restricted to the use of 8.3-format filenames with upper case characters only, the Human68K floppies are fully compatible with the Japanese 1232 KiB standard FAT floppy format (77 cylinders, 2 heads, 8 sectors, 1024 bytes/sector). This format is used by the NEC PC-9800, Fujitsu FMR and FM Towns series computers.

Novell NetWare versions 3.x and 4.x volumes can also support Microsoft-compatible long filenames, by loading an additional NetWare Loadable Module (NLM).

In order to support Java applications without implementing a VFAT-compatible scheme, the FlexOS-based IBM 4690 OS version 2 introduced its own virtual file system (VFS) architecture to store long filenames in the FAT file system in a backwards compatible fashion. If enabled, the virtual filenames (VFN) are available under separate logical drive letters, whereas the real filenames (RFN) remain available under the original drive letters.

== See also ==
- TRANS.TBL
- Rock Ridge
- Joliet (file system)
- Romeo (file system)
- 6.3 filename
- VFAT patent issues
- Design of the FAT file system
- File system
- Large file support (LFS)
