= Dpath =

dpath
- Developers: IBM, Microsoft
- Initial release: December 1987; 37 years ago
- Operating system: OS/2, Windows
- Type: Command

In computing, dpath is an internal cmd.exe command on IBM OS/2 and Microsoft Windows that allows using a set of files with the TYPE command and with input redirection as if they are in the current directory. On Windows it is undocumented and deprecated. dpath differs from the append command in the way it operates. dpath informs programs what directories they should search in order to find computer files. It is then up to the applications to recognize %DPATH%. Using the append command on the other side, programs are able to find files without recognizing that the command is in effect.

== History ==
In DOS the append command allows programs to open data files in specified directories as if they were in the current directory. Since Windows NT this is not working as the cmd.exe introduced command processor extensions and append become redundant. Despite this the executable was and is still available in 32-bit versions of Windows. Anyway, the command relied on %DPATH% environment variable, which can be edited with the dpath command. In the modern Windows installations only the dpath command is working despite the help message still is pointing to the append command.

== Syntax ==
     DPATH pathname [;pathname] [;pathname] [;pathname]...
     DPATH
     DPATH ;
  pathname : drive letter and/or folder
   ;       : the command 'DPATH ;' will clear the path

Without parameters the will display the current list of the directories. Editing %DPATH% environment variable also can be used. DPATH /? will print the append command help message.

== Usage ==
Input redirection:

C:\>echo hello>c:\test\in.txt
C:\batch>type c:\test\in.txt
hello
C:\>dir /a /b
C:\>set /p var=<in.txt
The system cannot find the file specified.
C:\>set var
Environment variable var not defined
C:\>dpath c:\test;
C:\>set /p var=<in.txt
C:\>set var
var=hello

With TYPE command:

C:\>echo hello>c:\test\in.txt
C:\batch>type c:\test\in.txt
hello
C:\>dir /a /b
C:\>set /p var=<in.txt
The system cannot find the file specified.
C:\>type in.txt
hello

== See also ==
- List of DOS commands
