= 4OS2 =

Command-line interpreter

- Developers: JP Software, SciTech Software, NetLabs.org
- Initial release: 8 June 1992; 33 years ago
- Stable release: JP Software: 4OS2 3.04a / 29 October 2002; 23 years ago
- Operating system: OS/2, ArcaOS
- Available in: English
- Type: Command shell
- License: Source-available, JP Software shareware license; does not allow just using the software without registering it forever

4OS2 is the OS/2 analogue of 4NT and 4DOS by JP Software, Inc. JP Software discontinued 4OS2, TCMDOS2 and TCMD16, making version 3.0, 2.0, 2.0 the final version of these. The code for 4OS2 has been released, and is maintained, first by SciTech, and then by NetLabs.

== Overview ==
Early versions of 4OS2 run in the Windows NT OS/2 emulation, and it was this particular running that led JP Software to port 4OS2 to Microsoft Windows. 4NT, for example, still has the OS/2 CMD.EXE commands like EXTPROC and REXX support, while earlier versions had commands like DPATH and LIBPATH, for setting these variables in the same manner that PATH does.

The early 4OS2 packages came with both 16- and 32-bit versions, the former to run under OS/2 1.x including Windows NT OS/2. Eventually the 16-bit support was dropped.

JP Software have their final releases of these products at their download page.

There was a 4OS2 v4.0 as different programmers took up maintaining the release, but these have been since merged.

4OS2 has found more recent life at NetLabs.

It is included in ArcaOS.
