= Ftype =

Windows command

ftype
- Developer: Microsoft
- Initial release: August 24, 1996; 29 years ago
- Operating system: Microsoft Windows
- Type: Command
- License: Proprietary commercial software
- Website: docs.microsoft.com/en-us/windows-server/administration/windows-commands/ftype

In computing, ftype is a command-line utility on Microsoft Windows that is used to display or change the link between a file type and an executable program.

== Overview ==
The ftype command was introduced as a shell builtin to cmd.exe with the release of Windows NT 4.0. It lists all Registry keys in HKEY CLASSES ROOT which contain the shell\open\command subkey, and prints out the REG SZ contents of the (default) value within these keys. Since it is an internal command built into cmd.exe, there is no FTYPE.EXE.

Because (default) values in HKEY_CLASSES_ROOT\<keyname>\shell\open\command contain information on how to open file types with registered extensions, this command essentially lists all registered file types, and which executables are used to open them, along with any switches used by the executable.

Multiple file extensions can be associated with the same file type and several file types can be linked to the same executable application.

== See also ==
- File format
- Filename extension
- File association
