= Special character =

#REDIRECT List of Unicode characters#Latin script

- To a section: This is a redirect from a topic that does not have its own page to a section of a page on the subject. For redirects to embedded anchors on a page, use {{R to anchor}} instead.
