= Take Command Console =

Command-line interpreter

- Developer: JP Software
- Stable release: 34.01 Build 27 (February 22, 2025; 8 months ago) [±]
- Operating system: Windows 10, 11; Server 2016, Server 2019, Server 2022 (Windows 7 or 32-bit Windows for <V. 26)
- Platform: Microsoft Windows x86-64 (IA-32 for <V. 26)
- Type: Command shell
- License: Proprietary commercial
- Website: jpsoft.com

Take Command Console (TCC), formerly known as 4DOS for Windows NT (4NT), is a command-line interpreter by JP Software, designed as a substitute for the default command interpreter in Microsoft Windows, CMD.EXE.

Take Command was the name that JP Software used for their GUI command-line interpreters for Windows 3.1 (TC16), Windows 32-bit (TC32) and later OS/2 Presentation Manager (TCOS2). These were released concurrently with version 4DOS 5.5, 4NT 2.5 and 4OS2 2.52. The OS/2 and Windows 16-bit survived until version 2.02, they are still available for download from the FTP site on JP Software.

== History ==
TCC is based on the earlier 4DOS command shell for MS-DOS, and 4OS2 for OS/2.

Beginning with version 12 of 4NT, support for Windows 95, 98, ME, NT and 2000 were removed. Beginning with version 16 of TCC, support for Windows XP was removed, although it might still run in XP. 4NT was renamed to Take Command Console as part of JP Software's Take Command version 9. Beginning with version 9, the name Take Command was applied to an entirely different assembly of products: TCI (Tabbed Command Interface) and 4NT. The original Take Command is no longer being developed. TCI was expanded to include a file manager and various other windows, while 4NT was renamed TCC, and issued in "light" form.

== Features ==
TCC provides a rich set of command line and batch programming capabilities. It can work in conjunction with other scripting languages, such as REXX, Ruby and Perl, or Windows Scripting languages, in the form of Active Scripting engines such as VBScript and JScript as well as PerlScript (via ActivePerl), TclScript (via ActiveTcl), PythonScript (via ActivePython), and the scripting engine version of Object REXX to provide greater access to the operating system.

TCC features a number of enhancements when compared to CMD.EXE

- Additional commands
- GUI commands (msgbox, querybox, etc.)
- Extended functionality of existing commands
- Extended batch file processing facilities
- Support for command aliases, also in scripts
- Enhanced wildcards and the ability to filter by file sizes, date and time stamps, etcetera
- Context-specific offline or online help
- Colored directory listings
- More internal variables
- Variable functions
- Integrated development environment (IDE)
- An interactive debugger for batch files, including a built-in syntax highlighting text editor
- Configuration stored in an INI file
- Support for several internet communication protocols:
  - File Transfer Protocol (FTP)
  - Trivial File Transfer Protocol (TFTP)
  - FTPS (FTP Secure)
  - HTTP
  - HTTPS
  - Jabber instant messaging
- Support for plugins to provide custom functionality
- Multiple command shells in tabbed windows

=== Take Command ===
Take Command is a command-line interpreter for the Microsoft Windows line of operating systems. Its advantages over the regular command shell are analogous to those of 4DOS over the COMMAND.COM supplied with MS-DOS.

Beginning with version 9, Tabbed Console Interface and 4NT have been merged into the Take Command product line. 4NT was renamed to Take Command Console, with a Lite Edition (TCC/LE) released as freeware. Take Command includes a tabbed interface, configurable toolbars, and an integrated graphical file explorer. Take Command adds a built-in batch file editor and debugger, FTP and HTTP file access in commands, network file system access, Active Scripting integration, system monitoring commands, and Windows service controls.

Features of note include:

- Command aliases
- Command-line completion
- Command history
- File globbing / Wildcards
- Redirection and piping
- Direct access to FTP, TFTP and HTTP
- Context-specific online help
- Colored directory listings
- Variable functions
- Fully customizable

== See also ==
- Comparison of command shells
