= Command Prompt (Windows) =

Shell for Windows NT and other operating systems

- Other names: Windows Command Processor; cmd.exe
- Developers: Microsoft, IBM, ReactOS contributors
- Release: December 1987; 38 years ago
- Operating system: Windows NT family; Windows CE family; OS/2; eComStation; ArcaOS; ReactOS
- Platform: IA-32, x86-64, ARM (and historically DEC Alpha, MIPS, PowerPC, and Itanium)
- Predecessor: COMMAND.COM
- Type: Command-line interpreter

Command Prompt, or Windows Command Processor, is a shell program on later versions of Windows (NT and CE families), OS/2, eComStation, ArcaOS, and ReactOS. In some versions of Windows (CE .NET 4.2, CE 5.0 and Embedded CE 6.0) it is referred to as the Command Processor Shell. Implementation differs between operating systems, but with significant consistency of behavior and available commands.

Older, related operating systems, DOS and Windows 9x, provided COMMAND.COM as the shell. Command Prompt (cmd.exe) replaced COMMAND.COM in the Windows product line with the introduction of NT. Current versions of Windows include PowerShell as an alternative shell that runs side-by-side with Command Prompt.

The initial version of Command Prompt for Windows NT was developed by Therese Stowell. Windows CE 2.11 was the first embedded Windows release to support a console and a Windows CE version of Command Prompt. The ReactOS implementation of Command Prompt is derived from FreeCOM, the FreeDOS command line interpreter.

== Use ==
=== Desktop integration ===
In Windows, the shell is presented in the desktop via Windows Terminal or on older versions via Windows Console.

=== Concurrent piping ===
In OS/2 and Windows, the shell supports pipes to allow both sides of a pipeline to run concurrently. As a result, it is possible to redirect the standard error stream. In contrast, COMMAND.COM uses temporary files, and runs the two sides serially, one after the other.

=== Command separator ===
Multiple commands can be included in a single line using the command separators &, && or ||.

With the & separator, a subsequent command is executed even if the previous command indicates an error. In the following example, each of the three commands is executed, one after the other, and regardless of their exit code.

>CommandA & CommandB & CommandC

With the && separator, a command must succeed, i.e. yield the exit code 0, for the subsequent command to execute. In the following example, CommandB only executes if CommandA completes successfully, and CommandC only executes if CommandB also completes successfully.

>CommandA && CommandB && CommandC

With the || separator, a command must fail, i.e. yield an exit code not equal 0, for the subsequent command to execute. In the following example, CommandB executes if CommandA fails, and CommandC executes if CommandB succeeds.

>CommandA || CommandB && CommandC

=== Command line limit ===
The shell limits the length of a command line which includes entered text, individual environment variables that are inherited by other processes, and all environment variable expansions On Windows XP and later, the maximum length is 8191 (2^{13}-1) characters. On earlier versions, such as Windows 2000 or Windows NT 4.0, the maximum length is 2047 (2^{11}-1) characters.

=== Escaping special characters ===
The shell reserves the following characters as special: &<>[]{}^=;!'+,`~ and whitespace. In some cases, an argument that contains such characters must be enclosed in double quotes to escape from the special character handling. For example:

>echo me & you
me
'you' is not recognized as an internal or external command,
operable program or batch file.

>echo "me & you"
"me & you"

== Internal commands ==
The following sections list internal commands for implementations of the shell on various operating systems.

=== OS/2 ===
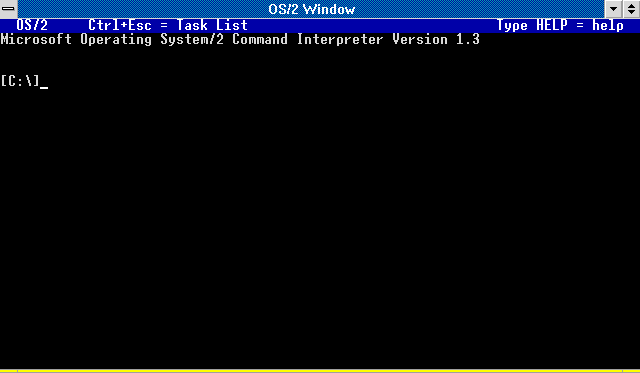
cmd.exe running in OS/2 Window on OS/2 version 1.3

Internal commands in OS/2:

- break
- chcp
- cd
- chdir
- cls
- copy
- date
- del
- detach
- dir
- dpath
- echo
- erase
- exit
- for
- goto
- if
- md
- mkdir
- path
- pause
- prompt
- rd
- rem
- ren
- rename
- rmdir
- set
- shift
- start
- time
- type
- ver
- verify
- vol

=== Windows NT family ===
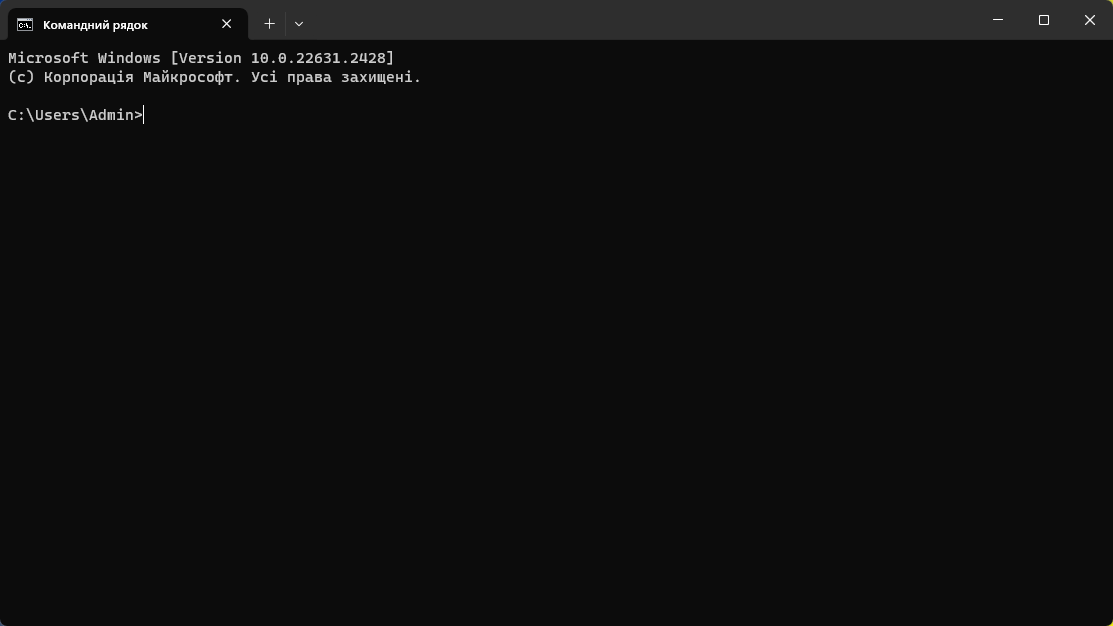
cmd.exe running in Windows Terminal on Ukrainian Windows 11

Internal commands in Windows NT and later:

- assoc
- break
- call
- cd
- chdir
- cls
- color
- copy
- date
- del
- dir
- dpath
- echo
- endlocal
- erase
- exit
- for
- ftype
- goto
- if
- keys
- md
- mkdir
- mklink
- move
- path
- pause
- popd
- prompt
- pushd
- rd
- rem
- ren
- rename
- rmdir
- set
- setlocal
- shift
- start
- time
- title
- type
- ver
- verify
- vol

=== Windows CE ===
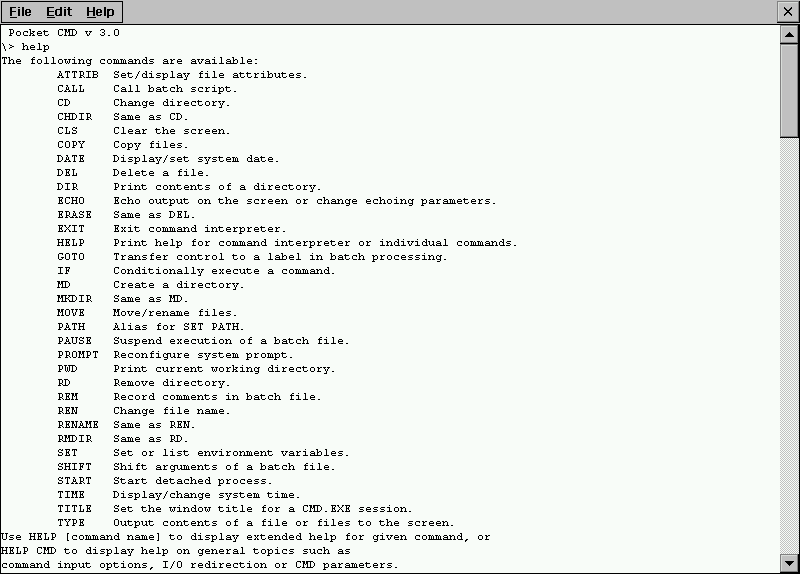
Pocket CMD v 3.0 (cmd.exe) on Windows CE 3.0

Internal commands in Windows CE .NET 4.2, Windows CE 5.0 and Windows Embedded CE 6.0:

- attrib
- call
- cd
- chdir
- cls
- copy
- date
- del
- dir
- echo
- erase
- exit
- goto
- help
- if
- md
- mkdir
- move
- path
- pause
- prompt
- pwd
- rd
- rem
- ren
- rename
- rmdir
- set
- shift
- start
- time
- title
- type

The net command is available as an external command.

=== ReactOS ===
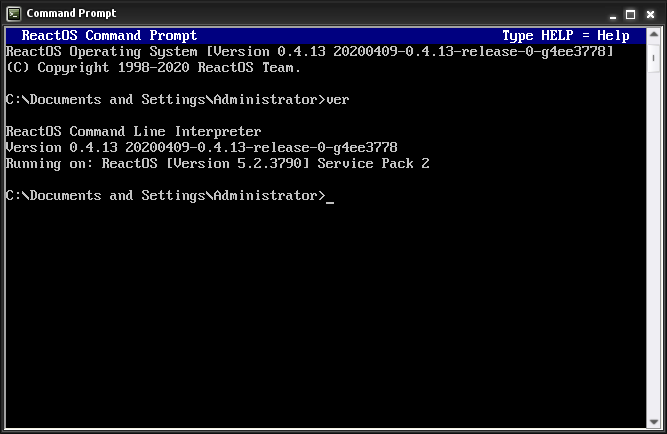
cmd.exe on ReactOS

Internal commands in ReactOS:

- ?
- alias
- assoc
- beep
- call
- cd
- chdir
- choice
- cls
- color
- copy
- ctty
- date
- del
- delete
- delay
- dir
- dirs
- echo
- echos
- echoerr
- echoserr
- endlocal
- erase
- exit
- for
- free
- goto
- history
- if
- memory
- md
- mkdir
- mklink
- move
- path
- pause
- popd
- prompt
- pushd
- rd
- rmdir
- rem
- ren
- rename
- replace
- screen
- set
- setlocal
- shift
- start
- time
- timer
- title
- type
- ver
- verify
- vol

== Comparison with COMMAND.COM ==
On Windows, cmd.exe provides various user experience enhancements as compared to COMMAND.COM, including:

- More detailed error reporting for malformed commands than the generic COMMAND.COM "Bad command or file name". In OS/2, errors are reported in the chosen language of the system, their text being taken from the system message files. The HELP command can then be issued with the error message number to obtain further information.
- Supports using of arrow keys to scroll through command history. With COMMAND.COM, this functionality was only available in DR DOS (via HISTORY) and later via an external component called DOSKEY.
- Adds rotating command-line completion for file and folder paths, where the user can cycle through results for the prefix using the Tab ↹, and ⇧ Shift+Tab ↹ for reverse direction.
- Treats the caret character (^) as the escape character; the character following it is to be taken literally. There are special characters in cmd.exe and COMMAND.COM that are meant to alter the behavior of the command line processor. The caret character forces the command line processor to interpret them literally.
- Supports delayed variable expansion with SETLOCAL EnableDelayedExpansion, allowing values of variables to be calculated at runtime instead of during parsing of script before execution (Windows 2000 and later), fixing DOS idioms that made using control structures hard and complex. The extensions can be disabled, providing a stricter compatibility mode.
- The COMMAND.COM DELTREE command was merged into the rd command via the /S switch.
- SetLocal and EndLocal commands limit the scope of changes to the environment. Changes made to the command line environment after SetLocal are local to the batch file. EndLocal restores the previous settings.
- The call command allows subroutines within batch file. The COMMAND.COM CALL command only supports calling external batch files.
- File name parser extensions to the set command are comparable with C shell.
- The set command can perform expression evaluation.
- An expansion of the for command supports parsing files and arbitrary sets in addition to file names.
- The new pushd and popd commands provide access past navigated paths similar to forward and back buttons in a web browser or File Explorer.
- The conditional if command can perform case-insensitive comparisons and numeric equality and inequality comparisons in addition to case-sensitive string comparisons. This was available in DR-DOS, but not in PC DOS or MS-DOS.

== See also ==
- Comparison of command shells
- List of DOS commands
