= Use =

Use, usage, or utilization/utilisation may refer to:

== Names ==
- Use Lahoz, Spanish writer
- USS Usage (AM-130), a formerly US Navy ship
- Saint-Usage (disambiguation), multiple places in France

== Language ==
- Usage (language), the way in which it is employed by its speakers
  - Use of language by children, the subject of errors in early word use
- Use of a word, in use–mention distinction
- Radical 101, a Chinese character component meaning "use"

== Law ==
- Use (law), a purpose for property which a recipient is obligated to enable
- Usus, the right to use or enjoy a thing possessed, directly and without altering it, an aspect of usufruct
- Use of an unsold product, the subject of use tax
- Beneficial use, a right on others' property
- Use of a body part, animal, equipment, premises, or other property, the subject of loss of use
- Use of a trademark, such as in nominative use, concurrent use registration, allegation of use, amendment to allege use, intent to use, and statement of use

== Computing and telecommunications ==
- Use of a variable, in a use-define chain
- Use of a pointer, in use-after-free
- Use of an external resource, an aspect of time-of-check to time-of-use bugs
- Space usage, the amount of data storage consumed by a task
  - Disk usage, the amount of non-volatile storage space currently occupied
- CPU usage, the relative amount of time during which a processor performed a task
- Channel use, a quantity of signal transmission
- Channel utilization, a normalized measure of network throughput
- Circuit utilization, how much of a programmable chip is used
- Usage, how much a piece of software is used, the subject of usage-based licensing
- Usage, how to use a command-line program, the subject of a usage message or help message
- Use, the tasks a computer can accomplish, such as in Linux range of use
- Use, actions performed on a computer system, the subject of terms of use and an acceptable use policy

== Engineering and design ==
- Use, how something is used, the subject of use error
- Use, the subject of use-centered design, a philosophy focused on goals and tasks
- Usage, the subject of usage-centered design, an approach focused on user intentions and usage patterns
- Usage, the subject of usage perspective development, a procedure that analyses and integrates user requirements

== Other uses ==
- Use (liturgy), subset of a Christian liturgical ritual family used by a particular group or diocese
- Consumption (economics)
  - Resource consumption, use of natural resources
    - Resource depletion, use to the point of lack of supply
    - In situ resource utilization, a practice in space exploration
  - Psychological manipulation, in a form that treats a person is as a means to an end
  - Utilization, how much a piece of equipment is used, which can be quantified with the utilization factor
    - Rental utilization, quantification of the use of assets to be continuously let
    - Capacity utilization, the extent to which a firm or nation employs its installed productive capacity
  - A single use, the lifespan of a disposable product
  - Use of a perishable product, the subject of a use by date
  - Use, the subject of use value
  - Use, a purpose for a good or service, as in marginal use
  - Use, a quantity used to compute a stocks-to-use ratio
- Utilization, the subject of Progressive utilization theory, a socioeconomic and political philosophy
- Utilization of employees' time as billable hours, measured by utilization rate
- Usage of a vehicle:
  - A factor of cost of usage-based insurance
  - A variable measured by health and usage monitoring systems
- Use of physical artifacts:
  - Utilization or grabbing of objects, the subject of utilization behavior
  - Tool use by prehistoric people, the goal of use-wear analysis
  - Tool use by non-human animals
- Utilization of land by animals, quantified by utilization distribution
- Land use
- Drug use (disambiguation) / Substance use (disambiguation)
- Use, how a pharmaceutical drug is used, which may be off-label use
- Use of a medical procedure, the subject of appropriate use criteria
- Utilization of health care services, the subject of utilization management
- Civilian and military use, the consumers of dual-use technology
- Utilisation, an aspect of carbon capture, utilisation, and storage
- Utilization, operating conditions for an electric circuit, grouped into utilization categories

== See also ==
- Use case, in software and systems engineering
- User story, in software development and product management
- First use (disambiguation)
- USE (disambiguation)
- Used (disambiguation)
- Using (disambiguation)
- User (disambiguation)
- Useless (disambiguation)
- Usability
