= AAU =

AAU most commonly may refer to:

- Association of American Universities, a selective group of 73 major research universities in North America

AAU may also refer to:

== Education ==
- Aalborg University, in Denmark
- Academy of Art University, in San Francisco, California, US
- Addis Ababa University, in Ethiopia
- Allied American University, Laguna Hills, California, US
- Alpen-Adria-University of Klagenfurt, in Austria
- Anand Agricultural University, in Anand, Gujarat, India
- Anglo-American University, in Prague, Czech Republic
- Antillean Adventist University, in Mayagüez, Puerto Rico
- Assam Agricultural University, in Jorhat, Assam, India
- Association of African Universities

== Healthcare ==
- Acute assessment unit, in a UK hospital
- Acute anterior uveitis, an inflammation of the middle layer of the eye

== Other uses ==
- AAU, a codon for the amino acid asparagine
- Abau language, a language of Papua New Guinea
- Allgemeine Arbeiter-Union – Einheitsorganisation, a German communist organisation
- Alpha acid unit, a measure of the bitterness of hops used in brewing beer
- Amateur Athletic Union, an amateur sports organization in the US
- Amendment to allege use, a legal term
- Assigned amount units, emission allowances created and allocated under the Marrakech Accords of the Kyoto protocol
- Americanos U.S.A., an American bus company
- Asau Airport in Vaisigano District, Samoa (IATA airport code AAU)
