= Substance =

Substance may refer to:

- Matter, anything that has mass and takes up space

== Chemistry ==
- Substance (chemistry), a material with a definite chemical composition
- Drug, a chemical agent affecting an organism

== Arts, entertainment, and media ==
=== Music ===
- Substance, a 2002 album by Blank & Jones
- Substance (Joy Division album), 1988
- Substance 1987, a New Order album
- "Substance", a song by Haste the Day on the album Burning Bridges
- "Substance" (song), a 2022 song by Demi Lovato
- "Substance", a 2000 dance track by Blu Peter

=== Other media ===
- The Substance, 2024 film
- SubStance, an interdisciplinary journal on literature published by the University of Wisconsin Press
- Metal Gear Solid 2: Substance, an update of the video game Metal Gear Solid 2: Sons of Liberty

== Religion and philosophy ==
- Dravya, a term used in Jainism to refer a substance
- Ousia, term for substance in ancient Greek philosophy and Christian theology
- Substance theory, an ontological theory positing that a substance is distinct from its properties

== Software ==
- Substance 3D Modeler, software from Adobe for 3D content creation

== See also ==
- Substance use (disambiguation)
- Substance control (disambiguation)
- Substantial (rapper)
