= Command-line interface =

Means of entering commands to software

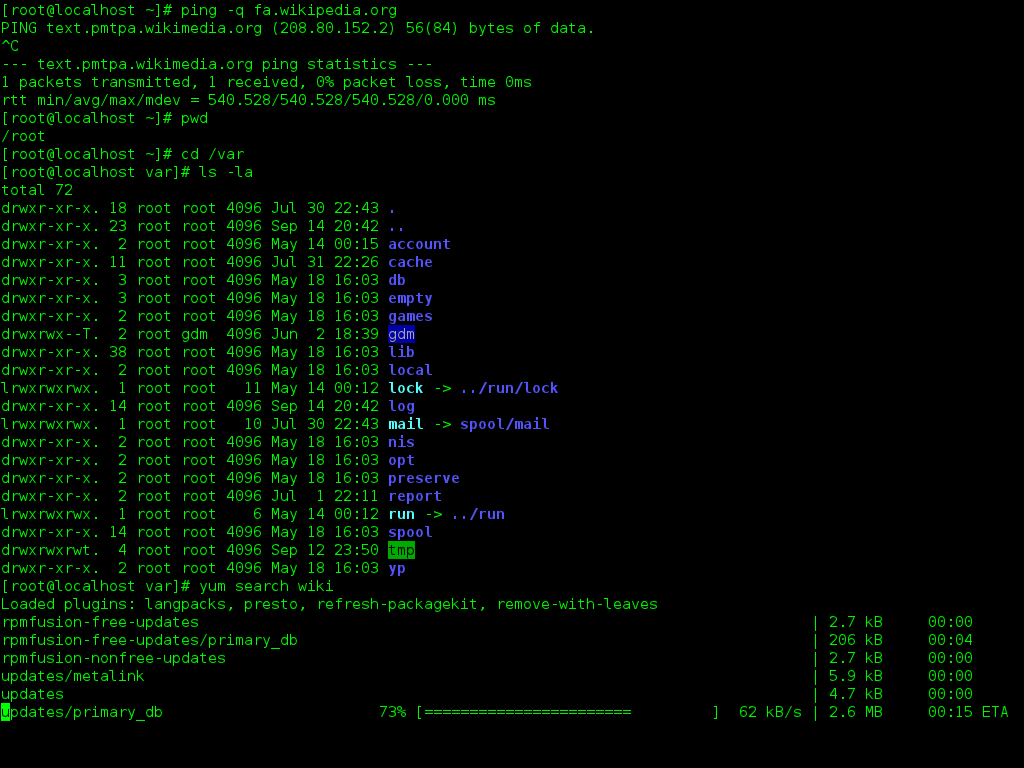
Screenshot of a sample Bash session in GNOME Terminal 3, Fedora 15

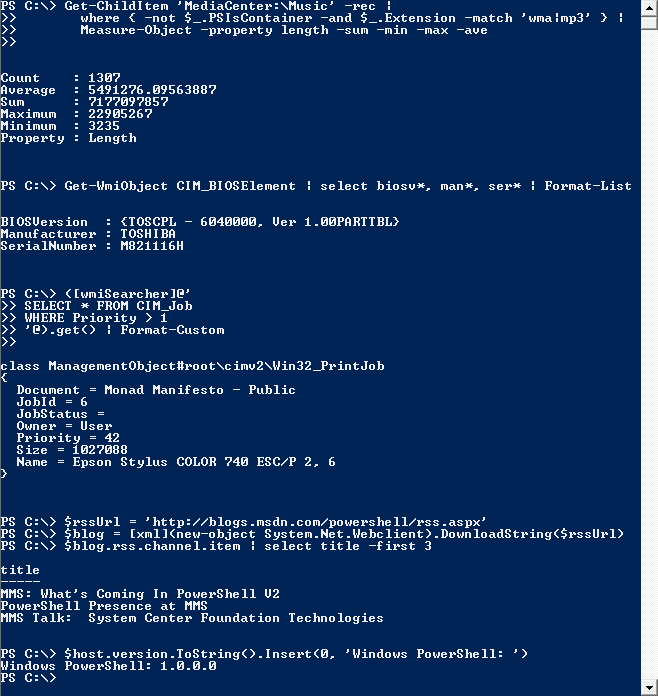
Screenshot of Windows PowerShell 1.0, running on Windows Vista

A command-line interface (CLI), also known as a command-line shell, is a means of interacting with software via commands – each formatted as a line of text. The concept of interacting with a computer via text evolved over two decades, transitioning from physical hardware to sophisticated software. Before the CLI, computers were programmed using physical switches or punched cards. The shift toward a "command" style interaction began with the use of teleprinters/teletypes. Early systems like the Whirlwind I (1951) at MIT began utilizing typewriter-like inputs for direct control, moving away from batch processing where you'd hand a stack of cards to an operator and wait hours for a result. Devices like the Teletype Model 33, introduced in 1963, allowed operators to type a command and receive a printed response from the computer.

The command-line interpreter emerged when computers became powerful enough to handle multiple users at once, known as time-sharing. The Compatible Time-Sharing System (CTSS), developed in 1961 at MIT, introduced the first true command-line interpreter. For the first time, a user could type a command like LOGIN or PRINT, and a dedicated program (the supervisor) would parse that text and execute the corresponding function. In 1964, Louis Pouzin introduced the software we now recognize as a "shell" for the Multics operating system, providing a programmable environment for executing scripts. Many utilities for operating system management and software development provide CLIs.

Many CLIs enable software automation, since commands can be stored in a script file that can be used repeatedly. A script allows its contained commands to be executed as a group (as a single program).

Alternatives to a CLI include a GUI (including the desktop metaphor such as Windows), text-based menuing (including DOS Shell and IBM AIX SMIT), and keyboard shortcuts.

== Comparison to graphical user interfaces ==
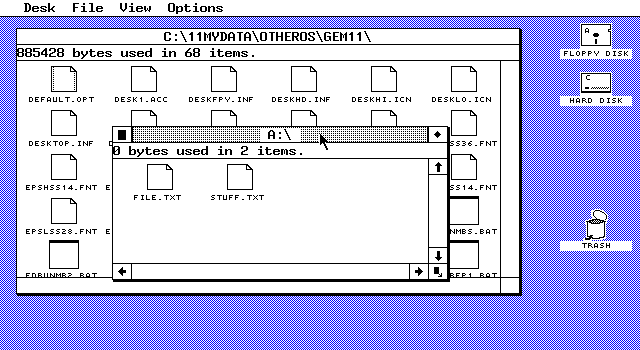
A graphical user interface with icons and windows (GEM 1.1 Desktop)

Compared with a graphical user interface, a command-line interface requires fewer system resources to implement. Since options to commands are given in a few characters in each command line, an experienced user often finds the options easier to access. Automation of repetitive tasks is simplified by line editing and history mechanisms for storing recently or frequently used sequences, allowing review and repetition of commands; this may extend to a scripting language that can take parameters and variable options.

A command-line system may require online or paper manuals for the user's reference, although often a help option provides a concise review of the options of a command. The command-line environment may not provide graphical enhancements such as different fonts or extended edit windows found in a GUI. It may be difficult for a new user to become familiar with all the commands and options available, compared with the icons and drop-down menus of a graphical user interface, without reference to manuals.

== Types ==
=== Operating system command-line interfaces ===
Operating system (OS) command-line interfaces are usually distinct programs supplied with the operating system. A program that implements such a text interface is often called a command-line interpreter, command processor, or shell.

Examples of command-line interpreters are Nushell, DEC's DIGITAL Command Language (DCL) in OpenVMS and RSX-11, the various Unix shells (sh, ksh, csh, tcsh, zsh, Bash, etc.), CP/M's CCP, DOS' COMMAND.COM, as well as the OS/2 and Windows cmd.exe programs, the latter groups being based heavily on DEC's RSX-11 and RSTS CLIs. Under most operating systems, it is possible to replace the default shell program with alternatives; examples include 4DOS for DOS, 4OS2 for OS/2, and 4NT / Take Command for Windows.

Although the term shell is often used to describe a command-line interpreter, strictly speaking, a shell is a command interpreter and processor and by extension a program that provides an interface (either a user interface (command-line interface, GUI, etc...) or a programming interface) to a command interpreter and processor and to the broad capabilities of the operating system. For example, the default Windows GUI is a shell GUI named EXPLORER.EXE, as defined in the SHELL=EXPLORER.EXE line in the WIN.INI configuration file. This program, strictly speaking, is a shell GUI and, by extension, a shell (strictly speaking, the Windows shell is shell32.dll not explorer.exe, which is a shell GUI for shell32.dll), but it is not a CLI (command-line interpreter) nor a shell CLI (shell command-line interface).

=== Application command-line interfaces ===
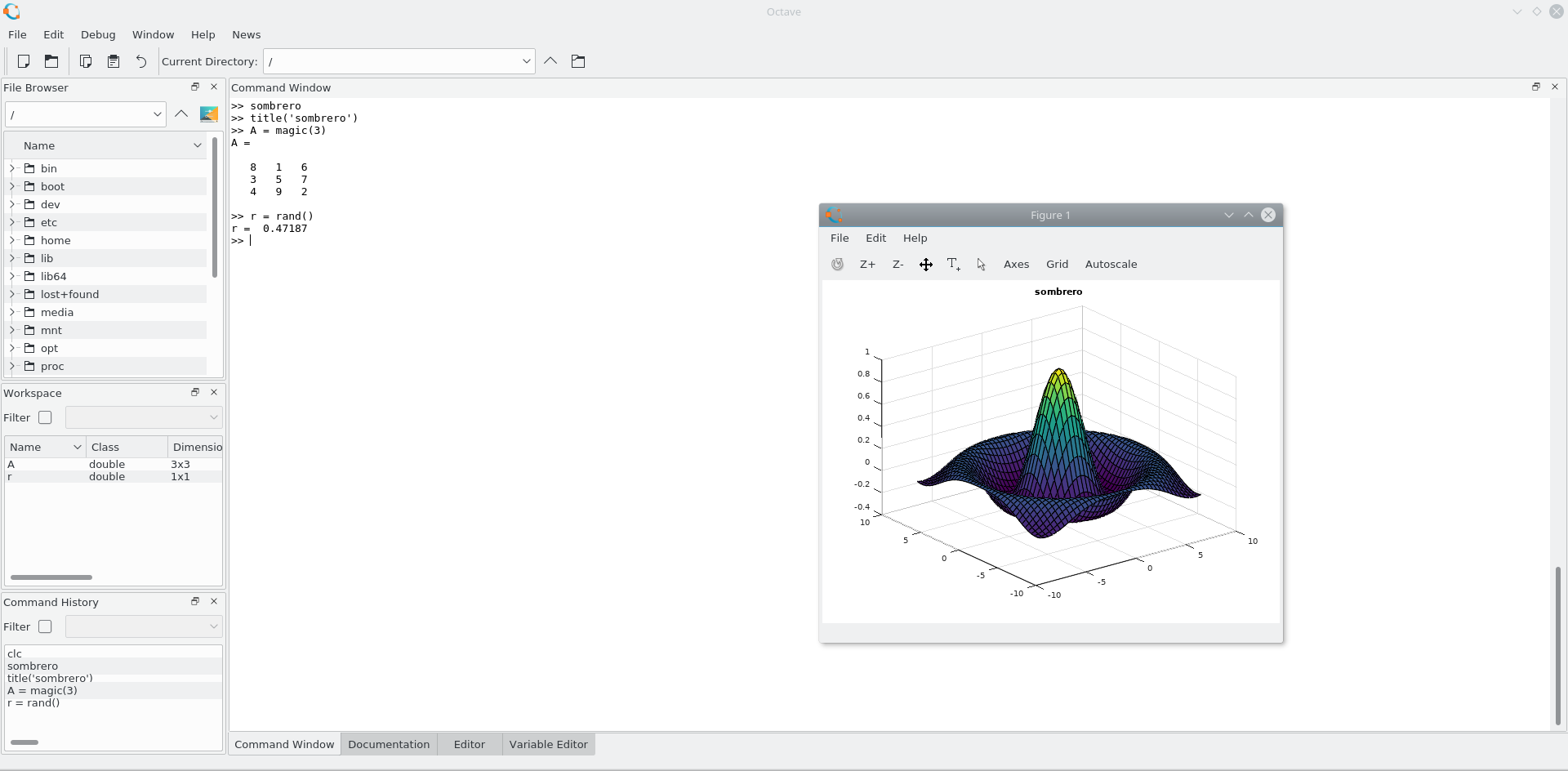
GNU Octave's GUI with command-line interface

Application programs (as opposed to operating systems) may also have command-line interfaces.

An application program may support none, any, or all of these three major types of command-line interface mechanisms:

- Parameters: Most command-line interfaces support a means to pass additional information to a program when it is launched.
- Interactive command-line sessions: After launch, a program may provide an operator with an independent means to enter commands.
- Inter-process communication: Most operating systems support means of inter-process communication (for example, standard streams or named pipes). Command lines from client processes may be redirected to a CLI program by one of these methods.

Some applications support a CLI, presenting their own prompt to the user and accepting command lines. Other programs support both a CLI and a GUI. In some cases, a GUI is simply a wrapper around a separate CLI executable file. In other cases, a program may provide a CLI as an optional alternative to its GUI. CLIs and GUIs often support different functionality. For example, all features of MATLAB, a numerical analysis computer program, are available via the CLI, whereas the MATLAB GUI exposes only a subset of features.

In Colossal Cave Adventure from 1975, the user uses a CLI to enter one or two words to explore a cave system.

== History ==
The command-line interface evolved from a form of communication conducted by people over teleprinter/teletype (TTY) machines. Sometimes these involved sending an order or a confirmation using telex. Early computer systems often used a teleprinter to interact with an operator.

The mechanical teleprinter was replaced by a "glass tty", a keyboard and screen emulating the teleprinter. "Smart" terminals permitted additional functions, such as cursor movement over the entire screen, or local editing of data on the terminal for transmission to the computer. As the microcomputer revolution replaced the traditional – minicomputer + terminals – time-sharing architecture, hardware terminals were replaced by terminal emulators — PC software that interpreted terminal signals sent through the PC's serial ports. These were typically used to interface an organization's new PC's with their existing mini- or mainframe computers, or to connect PC to PC. Some of these PCs were running bulletin board system software.

Early operating system CLIs were implemented as part of resident monitor programs, and could not easily be replaced. The first implementation of the shell as a replaceable component was part of the Multics time-sharing operating system. In 1964, MIT Computation Center staff member Louis Pouzin developed the RUNCOM tool for executing command scripts while allowing argument substitution. Pouzin coined the term shell to describe the technique of using commands like a programming language, and wrote a paper about how to implement the idea in the Multics operating system. Pouzin returned to his native France in 1965, and the first Multics shell was developed by Glenda Schroeder.

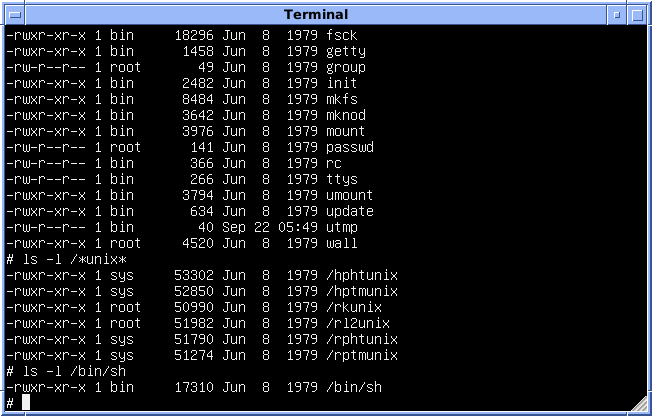
Bourne shell interaction on Version 7 Unix

The first Unix shell, the V6 shell, was developed by Ken Thompson in 1971 at Bell Labs and was modeled after Schroeder's Multics shell. The Bourne shell was introduced in 1977 as a replacement for the V6 shell. Although it is used as an interactive command interpreter, it was also intended as a scripting language and contains most of the features that are commonly considered to produce structured programs. The Bourne shell led to the development of the KornShell (ksh), Almquist shell (ash), and the popular Bourne-again shell (or Bash).

Early microcomputers themselves were based on a command-line interface such as CP/M, DOS or Applesoft BASIC. During the 1980s and 1990s, the introduction of the Apple Macintosh and Microsoft Windows on PCs saw the command-line interface as the primary user interface replaced by the graphical user interface. The command line remained available as an alternative user interface, often used by system administrators and other advanced users for system administration, computer programming and batch processing.

In November 2006, Microsoft released version 1.0 of Windows PowerShell (formerly codenamed Monad), which combined features of traditional Unix shells with their proprietary object-oriented .NET Framework. MinGW and Cygwin are open-source packages for Windows that offer a Unix-like CLI. Microsoft provides MKS Inc.'s ksh implementation MKS Korn shell for Windows through their Services for UNIX add-on.

Since 2001, the Macintosh operating system macOS has been based on a Unix-like operating system called Darwin. On these computers, users can access a Unix-like command-line interface by running the terminal emulator program called Terminal, which is found in the Utilities sub-folder of the Applications folder, or by remotely logging into the machine using ssh. Z shell is the default shell for macOS; Bash, tcsh, and the KornShell are also provided. Before macOS Catalina, Bash was the default.

== Usage ==
A CLI is used whenever a large vocabulary of commands or queries, coupled with a wide (or arbitrary) range of options, can be entered more rapidly as text than with a pure GUI. This is typically the case with operating system command shells. CLIs are also used by systems with insufficient resources to support a graphical user interface. Some computer language systems (such as Python, Forth, LISP, Rexx, and many dialects of BASIC) provide an interactive command-line mode (generally a read–eval–print loop) to allow for rapid evaluation of code.

CLIs are often used by programmers and system administrators, in engineering and scientific environments, and by technically advanced personal computer users. CLIs are also popular among people with visual disabilities since the commands and responses can be displayed using refreshable braille displays.

== Anatomy of a shell CLI ==
The general pattern of a command line is:

prompt command param1 param2 param3 … paramN

- prompt — output by the program to indicate that it's ready for input; a prompt may include contextual information and often ends with a symbol that provides a visual cue that input is expected
- command — input by the user; a command is usually one of two classes:
  1. Internal commands are recognized and processed by the command line interpreter. Internal commands are also called built-in commands.
  2. External commands run separate executables. The command line interpreter searches for executable files with names matching the external command.
- param1 …paramN — parameters provided by the user. The format and meaning of the parameters depend upon the command. In the case of external commands, the values of the parameters are delivered to the program as it is launched by the OS. Parameters may be either arguments or options.

In this format, the delimiters between command-line elements are whitespace characters and the end-of-line delimiter is the newline delimiter. This is a widely used (but not universal) convention.

A command-line interface can generally be considered as consisting of syntax and semantics. The syntax is the grammar that all commands must follow. In the case of operating systems, DOS and Unix each define their own set of rules that all commands must follow. In the case of embedded systems, each vendor, such as Nortel, Juniper Networks or Cisco Systems, defines their own proprietary set of rules. These rules also dictate how a user navigates through the system of commands. The semantics define what sort of operations are possible, on what sort of data these operations can be performed, and how the grammar represents these operations and data—the symbolic meaning in the syntax.

Two different CLIs may agree on either syntax or semantics, but it is only when they agree on both that they can be considered sufficiently similar to allow users to use both CLIs without needing to learn anything, as well as to enable re-use of scripts.

A simple CLI will display a prompt, accept a command line typed by the user terminated by the enter key, then execute the specified command and provide textual display of results or error messages. Advanced CLIs will validate, interpret and parameter-expand the command line before executing the specified command, and optionally capture or redirect its output.

Unlike a button or menu item in a GUI, a command line is typically self-documenting, stating exactly what the user wants done. In addition, command lines usually include many defaults that can be changed to customize the results. Useful command lines can be saved by assigning a character string or alias to represent the full command, or several commands can be grouped to perform a more complex sequence – for instance, compile the program, install it, and run it — creating a single entity, called a command procedure or script which itself can be treated as a command. These advantages mean that a user must figure out a complex command or series of commands only once, because they can be saved, to be used again.

The commands given to a CLI shell are often in one of the following forms:

- doSomething how toFiles
- doSomething how sourceFile destinationFile
- doSomething how < inputFile > outputFile
- doSomething how | doSomething how | doSomething how > outputFile

where doSomething is, in effect, a verb, how an adverb (for example, should the command be executed verbosely or quietly) and toFiles an object or objects (typically one or more files) on which the command should act. The > in the third example is a redirection operator, telling the command-line interpreter to send the output of the command not to its own standard output (the screen) but to the named file. This will overwrite the file. Using >> will redirect the output and append it to the file. Another redirection operator is the vertical bar (|), which creates a pipeline where the output of one command becomes the input to the next command.

=== CLI and resource protection ===
On some systems, such as Unix-like systems or Windows, one can modify the set of available commands by modifying which paths appear in the PATH environment variable or its equivalent. On Unix-like systems, the file containing the executable or script for a command also needs to be given execute permission. The directories in the path variable are searched in the order they are given. By re-ordering the path, one can run e.g. \OS2\MDOS\E.EXE instead of \OS2\E.EXE, when the default is the opposite. Renaming of the executables also works: people often rename their favourite editor to EDIT, for example.

The command line allows one to restrict available commands, such as access to advanced internal commands. The Bourne shell and workalikes such as Bash can be run as a restricted shell; among other things, this prohibits the user from modifying the PATH environment variable, so that if PATH is set to include only directories that contain only permissible commands, the user will only be able to run those commands. The Windows cmd.exe also supports restricting available commands. Often, shareware programs will limit the range of commands, including printing a command 'your administrator has disabled running batch files' from the prompt.

Some CLIs, such as those in network routers, have a hierarchy of modes, with a different set of commands supported in each mode. The set of commands are grouped by association with security, system, interface, etc. In these systems, the user might traverse through a series of sub-modes. For example, if the CLI had two modes called interface and system, the user might use the command interface to enter the interface mode. At this point, commands from the system mode may not be accessible until the user exits the interface mode and enters the system mode.

In IBM's flagship MVS operating systems, the Authorised Program Facility (APF) allows certain authorized programs to run with enhanced privileges, analogous to UID(0) in Unix-like systems. TSO/E supports calling, e.g., authorized commands, but only for those commands, programs and services in an installation-controlled list.

=== Command prompt ===
Prompt of a BBC Micro after switch-on or hard reset

A command prompt (or just prompt) is a sequence of (one or more) characters used in a command-line interface to indicate readiness to accept commands. It literally prompts the user to take action. A prompt usually ends with one of the characters $, %, #, :, > or - and often includes other information, such as the path of the current working directory and the hostname.

On many Unix and derivative systems, the prompt commonly ends in $ or % if the user is a normal user, but in # if the user is a superuser ("root" in Unix terminology).

End-users can often modify prompts. Depending on the environment, they may include colors, special characters, and other elements (like variables and functions for the current time, user, shell number or working directory) in order, for instance, to make the prompt more informative or visually pleasing, to distinguish sessions on various machines, or to indicate the current level of nesting of commands. On some systems, special tokens in the definition of the prompt can be used to cause external programs to be called by the command-line interpreter while displaying the prompt.

Example of prompt system displays

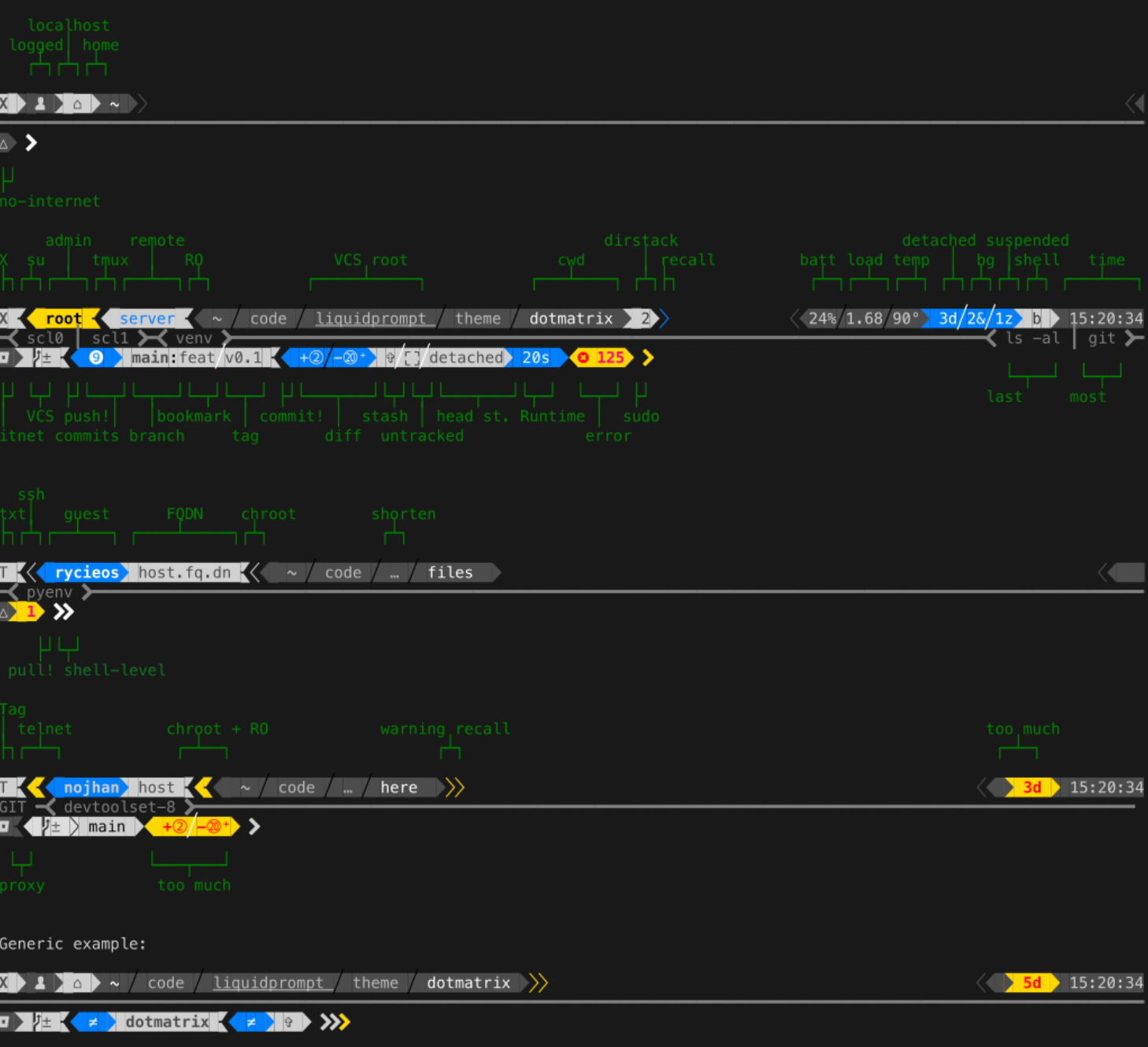
All the information that can be displayed by the "Liquidprompt" command prompt system, here using its "Jolly" theme

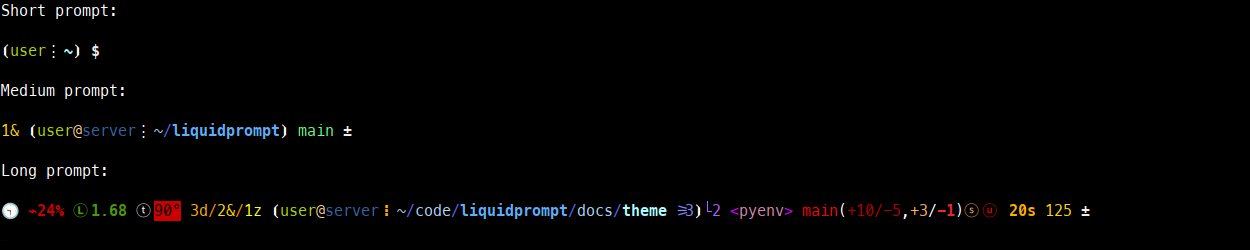
Liquidprompt display example, using its default theme

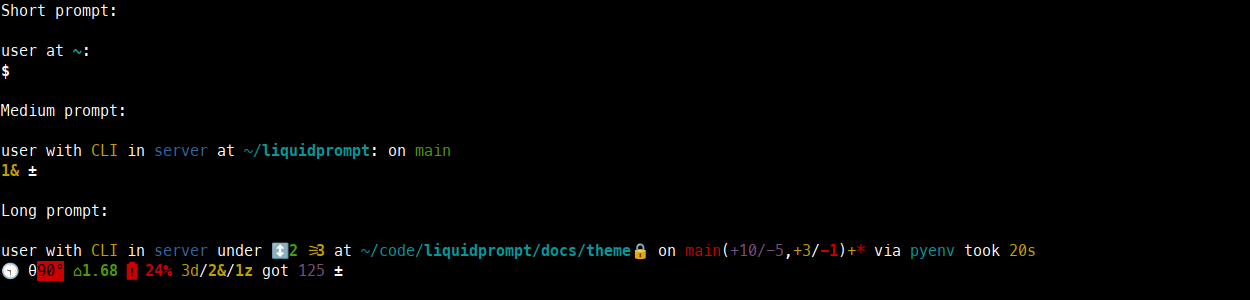
Liquidprompt display example, using its "Pureship" theme

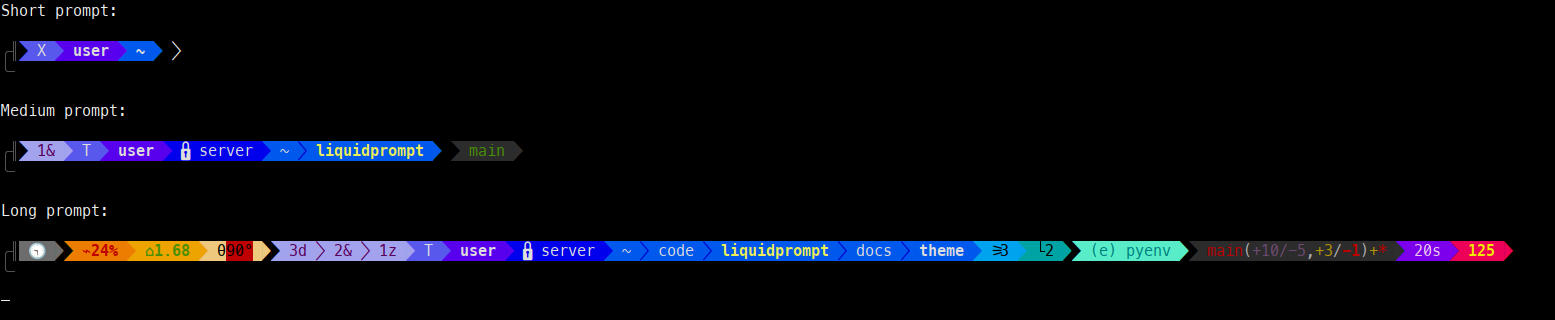
Liquidprompt display example, using its "Powerline" theme

In DOS' COMMAND.COM and in Windows NT's cmd.exe users can modify the prompt by issuing a PROMPT command or by directly changing the value of the corresponding %PROMPT% environment variable. The default of most modern systems, the C:\> style is obtained, for instance, with PROMPT $P$G. The default of older DOS systems, C> is obtained by just PROMPT, although on some systems this produces the newer C:\> style, unless used on floppy drives A: or B:; on those systems PROMPT $N$G can be used to override the automatic default and explicitly switch to the older style.

Many Unix systems feature the $PS1 variable (Prompt String 1), although other variables also may affect the prompt (depending on the shell used). In the Bash shell, a prompt of the form:

[time] user@host: work_dir $

could be set by issuing the command

export PS1='[\t] \u@\H: \W $'

In zsh the $RPROMPT variable controls an optional prompt on the right-hand side of the display. It is not a real prompt in that the location of text entry does not change. It is used to display information on the same line as the prompt, but right-justified.

In RISC OS the command prompt is a * symbol, and thus (OS) CLI commands are often referred to as star commands. One can also access the same commands from other command lines (such as the BBC BASIC command line), by preceding the command with a *.

In IBM's TSO, the command prompt is referred to as the READY prompt, after the word READY in the prompt.

Some shells, such as Bash, zsh, and PowerShell, allow the use of prompt systems that display a lot more information in the command prompt, like the type of remote connection, the state of machine sensors, or additional information about a version control system. They often use several ANSI colors, Unicode characters, and advanced shell features to set up a colorful display.

=== Arguments ===
An MS-DOS command line, illustrating parsing into command and arguments

A command-line argument or parameter is an item of information provided to a program when it is started. A program can have many command-line arguments that identify sources or destinations of information, or that alter the operation of the program.

When a command processor is active a program is typically invoked by typing its name followed by command-line arguments (if any). For example, in Unix and Unix-like environments, an example of a command-line argument is:

rm file.s

file.s is a command-line argument which tells the program rm to remove the file named file.s.

Some programming languages, such as C, C++ and Java, allow a program to interpret the command-line arguments by handling them as string parameters in the main function. Other languages, such as Python, expose operating system specific API (functionality) through the sys module, and in particular sys.argv for command-line arguments.

In Unix-like operating systems, a single - used in place of a file name is a special value specifying that a program should handle data coming from the standard input or send data to the standard output.

==== Command-line option ====
A command-line option or simply option (also known as a flag or switch) modifies the operation of a command; the effect is determined by the command's program. Options follow the command name on the command line, separated by, e.g., commas or spaces. Separators are not always required, such as Dir/? and DIR /? in DOS, which have the same effect of listing the DIR command's available options, whereas dir --help (in many versions of Unix) does require the option to be preceded by at least one space (and is case-sensitive).

The format of options varies widely between operating systems. In most cases, the syntax is by convention rather than an operating system requirement; the entire command line is simply a string passed to a program, which can process it in any way the programmer wants, so long as the interpreter can tell where the command name ends and its arguments and options begin.

A few representative samples of command-line options, most relating to listing files in a directory, to illustrate some conventions:

| Operating system | Command | Valid alternative | Notes |
|---|---|---|---|
| OpenVMS | directory/owner | Dir /Owner | instruct the directory command to also display the ownership of the files. Note the Directory command name is not case sensitive, and can be abbreviated to as few letters as required to remain unique. |
| Windows | DIR/Q/O:S d* | dir /q d* /o:s | display ownership of files whose names begin with d (or D), sorted by size, smallest first. Note spaces around argument d* are required. |
| Unix-like systems | ls -lS D* | ls -S -l D* | display in long format files and directories whose names begin with D (but not d), sorted by size (largest first). Note spaces are required around all arguments and options, but some can be run together, e.g. -lS is the same as -l -S. |
| Data General RDOS CLI | list/e/s 04-26-80/b | List /S/E 4-26-80/B | list every attribute for files created before 26 April 1980. Note the /B at the end of the date argument is a local switch, that modifies the meaning of that argument, while /S and /E are global switches, i.e. apply to the whole command. |
| VM/CMS CLI | LISTFILE (FULLDATE) | l(ful | includes the date the file was last written in the list. Note the LISTFILE command name is not case sensitive, and can be abbreviated to as few letters as required to remain unique. |
| OS/360 operator commands | START TAPERDR,DSNAME=FOO.BAR | S TAPERDR,DSN=FOO.BAR | Start the procedure named TAPERDR with the supplied data set name |
| TSO | LISTCAT LEVEL(FOO) MEMBERS | LISTC L(FOO) M | List datasets at specified index level and list members for each PDS. |
| TSO | SEND 'text' USER(FOO) | SE 'text' U(FOO) | Send message to specified user |

Command-line argument parsing is used to parse the arguments of a program, and such functionality is offered in various languages. For example, getopt() is in the C POSIX library for parsing arguments.

===== Abbreviating commands =====
In Multics, command-line options and subsystem keywords may be abbreviated. This idea appears to derive from the PL/I programming language, with its shortened keywords (e.g., STRG for STRINGRANGE and DCL for DECLARE). For example, in the Multics forum subsystem, the -long_subject parameter can be abbreviated -lgsj. It is also common for Multics commands to be abbreviated, typically corresponding to the initial letters of the words that are strung together with underscores to form command names, such as the use of did for delete_iacl_dir.

In some other systems abbreviations are automatic, such as permitting enough of the first characters of a command name to uniquely identify it (such as SU as an abbreviation for SUPERUSER) while others may have some specific abbreviations pre-programmed (e.g. MD for MKDIR in COMMAND.COM) or user-defined via batch scripts and aliases (e.g. alias md mkdir in tcsh).

===== Option conventions in DOS, Windows, OS/2 =====
On DOS, OS/2 and Windows, different programs called from their COMMAND.COM or CMD.EXE (or internally their commands) may use different syntax within the same operating system. For example:

- Options may be indicated by either of the switch characters: /, -, or either may be allowed. See below.
- They may or may not be case-sensitive.
- Sometimes options and their arguments are run together, sometimes separated by whitespace, and sometimes by a character, typically : or =; thus Prog -fFilename, Prog -f Filename, Prog -f:Filename, Prog -f=Filename.
- Some programs allow single-character options to be combined; others do not. The switch -fA may mean the same as -f -A, or it may be incorrect, or it may even be a valid but different parameter.

In DOS, OS/2 and Windows, the forward slash (/) is most prevalent, although the hyphen-minus is also sometimes used. In many versions of DOS (MS-DOS/PC DOS 2.xx and higher, all versions of DR-DOS since 5.0, as well as PTS-DOS, Embedded DOS, FreeDOS and RxDOS) the switch character (sometimes abbreviated switchar or switchchar) to be used is defined by a value returned from a system call (INT 21h/AX=3700h). The default character returned by this API is /, but can be changed to a hyphen-minus on the above-mentioned systems, except for under Datalight ROM-DOS and MS-DOS/PC DOS 5.0 and higher, which always return / from this call (unless one of many available TSRs to reenable the SwitChar feature is loaded). In some of these systems (MS-DOS/PC DOS 2.xx, DOS Plus 2.1, DR-DOS 7.02 and higher, PTS-DOS, Embedded DOS, FreeDOS and RxDOS), the setting can also be pre-configured by a SWITCHAR directive in CONFIG.SYS. General Software's Embedded DOS provides a SWITCH command for the same purpose, whereas 4DOS allows the setting to be changed via SETDOS /W:n. Under DR-DOS, if the setting has been changed from /, the first directory separator \ in the display of the PROMPT parameter $G will change to a forward slash / (which is also a valid directory separator in DOS, FlexOS, 4680 OS, 4690 OS, OS/2 and Windows) thereby serving as a visual clue to indicate the change. Also, the current setting is reflected also in the built-in help screens. Some versions of DR-DOS COMMAND.COM also support a PROMPT token $/ to display the current setting. COMMAND.COM since DR-DOS 7.02 also provides a pseudo-environment variable named %/% to allow portable batch jobs to be written. Several external DR-DOS commands additionally support an environment variable %SWITCHAR% to override the system setting.

However, many programs are hardwired to use / only, rather than retrieving the switch setting before parsing command-line arguments. A very small number, mainly ports from Unix-like systems, are programmed to accept - even if the switch character is not set to it (for example, netstat and ping, supplied with Microsoft Windows, will accept the /? option to list available options, and yet the list will specify the - convention).

===== Option conventions in Unix-like systems =====
In Unix-like systems, the ASCII hyphen-minus begins options; the new (and GNU) convention is to use two hyphens then a word (e.g. --create) to identify the option's use while the old convention (and still available as an option for frequently used options) is to use one hyphen then one letter (e.g., -c); if one hyphen is followed by two or more letters it may mean multiple options are being specified, or it may mean the second and subsequent letters are a parameter (such as filename or date) for the first option.

Two hyphen-minus characters without following letters (--) may indicate that the remaining arguments should not be treated as options, which is useful, for example, if a file name itself begins with a hyphen, or if further arguments are meant for an inner command (e.g., when using sudo). Double hyphen-minuses are also sometimes used to prefix long options where more descriptive option names are used. This is a common feature of GNU software. The getopt function and program, and the getopts command are usually used for parsing command-line options.

Unix command names, arguments and options are case-sensitive (except in a few examples, mainly where popular commands from other operating systems have been ported to Unix).

===== Option conventions in other systems =====
FlexOS, 4680 OS and 4690 OS use -.

CP/M typically used [.

Conversational Monitor System (CMS) uses a single left parenthesis to separate options at the end of the command from the other arguments. For example, in the following command, the options indicate that the target file should be replaced if it exists, and the date and time of the source file should be retained on the copy: COPY source file a target file b (REPLACE OLDDATE)

OS/360 operator commands use a comma-separated list of positional and keyword parameters; only documented command and keyword abbreviations are valid. Keyword values are separated from the keywords with equal signs.

TSO commands use a space-separated list of positional and keyword parameters; keywords may be truncated to any unique substring. Only documented command abbreviations are valid. Keyword values are inside parentheses.

Data General's CLI under their RDOS, AOS, etc. operating systems, as well as the version of CLI that came with their Business Basic, uses only / as the switch character, is case-insensitive, and allows local switches on some arguments to control the way they are interpreted, such as MAC/U LIB/S A B C $LPT/L has the global option U to the macro assembler command to append user symbols, but two local switches, one to specify LIB should be skipped on pass 2 and the other to direct listing to the printer, $LPT.

=== Built-in usage help ===
One of the criticisms of a CLI is the lack of cues to the user as to the available actions. In contrast, GUIs usually inform the user of available actions with menus, icons, or other visual cues. To overcome this limitation, many CLI programs display a usage message, typically when invoked with no arguments or one of ?, -?, -h, -H, /?, /h, /H, /Help, -help, or --help.

However, entering a program name without parameters in the hope that it will display usage help can be hazardous, as programs and scripts for which command line arguments are optional will execute without further notice.

Although desirable at least for the help parameter, programs may not support all option lead-in characters exemplified above. Under DOS, where the default command-line option character can be changed from / to -, programs may query the SwitChar API in order to determine the current setting. So, if a program is not hardwired to support them all, a user may need to know the current setting even to be able to reliably request help. If the SwitChar has been changed to - and therefore the / character is accepted as an alternative path delimiter at the DOS command line, programs might misinterpret options like /h or /H as paths rather than help parameters. However, if given as the first or only parameter, most DOS programs will, by convention, accept it as a request for help regardless of the current SwitChar setting.

In some cases, different levels of help can be selected for a program. Some programs supporting this allow giving a verbosity level as an optional argument to the help parameter (as in /H:1, /H:2, etc.) or they give just a short help on help parameters with a question mark and a longer help screen for the other help options.

Depending on the program, additional or more specific help on accepted parameters is sometimes available by either providing the parameter in question as an argument to the help parameter or vice versa (as in /H:W or in /W:? (assuming /W would be another parameter supported by the program)). (Note: An example is the comprehensive internal help system of the DR-DOS 7.03 DEBUG command, which can be invoked via ?? at the debug prompt (rather than only the default ? overview). Specific help pages can be selected via ?n (where n is the number of the page). Additionally, help for specific commands can be displayed by specifying the command name after ?, f.e. ?D will invoke help for the various dump commands (like D etc.). Some of these features were already supported by the DR DOS 3.41 SID86 and GEMSID.)

In a similar fashion to the help parameter, but much less common, some programs provide additional information about themselves (like mode, status, version, author, license or contact information) when invoked with an about parameter like -!, /!, -about, or --about.

Since the ? and ! characters typically also serve other purposes at the command line, they may not be available in all scenarios, therefore, they should not be the only options to access the corresponding help information.

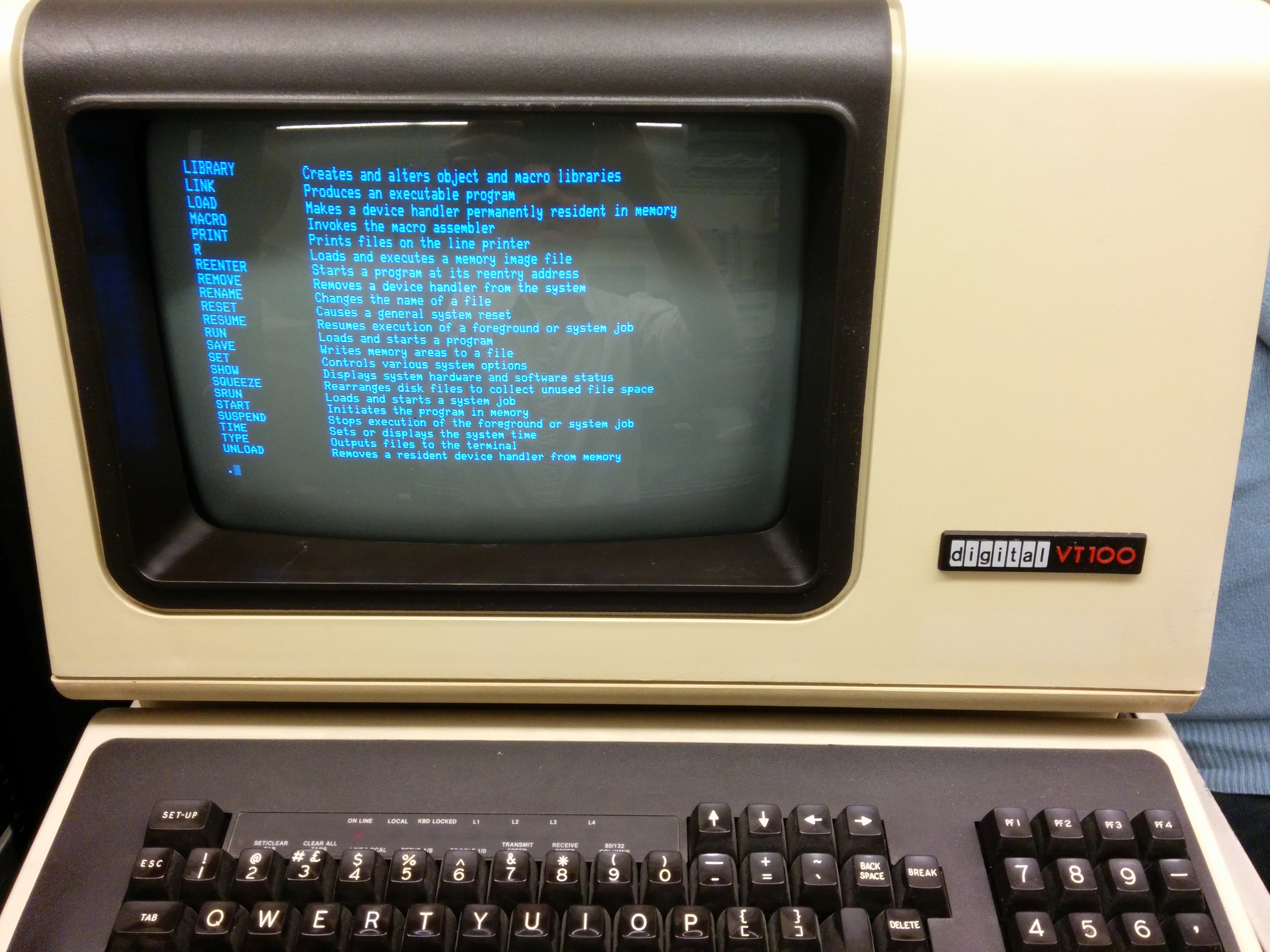
The end of the HELP command output from RT-11SJ displayed on a VT100

If more detailed help is necessary than provided by a program's built-in internal help, many systems support a dedicated external help command" command (or similar), which accepts a command name as a calling parameter and will invoke an external help system.

In the DR-DOS family, typing /? or /H at the COMMAND.COM prompt instead of a command itself will display a dynamically generated list of available internal commands; 4DOS and NDOS support the same feature by typing ? at the prompt (which is also accepted by newer versions of DR-DOS COMMAND.COM); internal commands can be individually disabled or reenabled via SETDOS /I. In addition to this, some newer versions of DR-DOS COMMAND.COM also accept a ?% command to display a list of available built-in pseudo-environment variables. Besides their purpose as quick help reference, this can be used in batch jobs to query the facilities of the underlying command-line processor.

=== Command description syntax ===
Built-in usage help and man pages commonly employ a small syntax to describe the valid command form: (Note: Notable difference for describing the command syntax of DOS-like operating systems: Windows Server 2003 R2 documentation uses italic letters for "information that the user must supply", but Windows Server 2008 documentation uses angle brackets. Italics can not be displayed by the internal help command, while there is no problem with angle brackets.)

- angle brackets for required parameters: ping <hostname>
- square brackets for optional parameters: mkdir [-p] <dirname>
- ellipses for repeated items: cp <source1> [source2…] <dest>
- vertical bars for choice of items: netstat {-t|-u}

Notice that these characters have different meanings than when used directly in the shell. Angle brackets may be omitted when confusing the parameter name with a literal string is not likely.

=== The space character ===
In many areas of computing, but particularly in the command line, the space character can cause problems as it has two distinct and incompatible functions: as part of a command or parameter, or as a parameter or name separator. Ambiguity can be prevented either by prohibiting embedded spaces in file and directory names in the first place (for example, by substituting them with underscores _), or by enclosing a name with embedded spaces between quote characters or using an escape character before the space, usually a backslash (\). For example

Long path/Long program name Parameter one Parameter two …

is ambiguous (is program name part of the program name, or two parameters?); however

Long_path/Long_program_name Parameter_one Parameter_two …,
LongPath/LongProgramName ParameterOne ParameterTwo …,
"Long path/Long program name" "Parameter one" "Parameter two" …

and

Long\ path/Long\ program\ name Parameter\ one Parameter\ two …

are not ambiguous. Unix-like operating systems minimize the use of embedded spaces to minimize the need for quotes. In Microsoft Windows, one often has to use quotes because embedded spaces (such as in directory names) are common.

== Command-line interpreter ==
Although most users think of the shell as an interactive command interpreter, it is really a programming language in which each statement runs a command. Because it must satisfy both the interactive and programming aspects of command execution, it is a strange language, shaped as much by history as by design.

— Brian W. Kernighan & Rob Pike

The term command-line interpreter is applied to computer programs designed to interpret a sequence of lines of text which may be entered by a user, read from a file or another kind of data stream. The context of interpretation is usually one of a given operating system or programming language.

Command-line interpreters allow users to issue various commands in a very efficient (and often terse) way. This requires the user to know the names of the commands and their parameters, and the syntax of the language that is interpreted.

The Unix #! mechanism and OS/2 EXTPROC command facilitate the passing of batch files to external processors. One can use these mechanisms to write specific command processors for dedicated uses, and process external data files which reside in batch files.

Many graphical interfaces, such as the OS/2 Presentation Manager and early versions of Microsoft Windows use command lines to call helper programs to open documents and programs. The commands are stored in the graphical shell or in files like the registry or the OS/2 OS2USER.INI file.

=== Early history ===
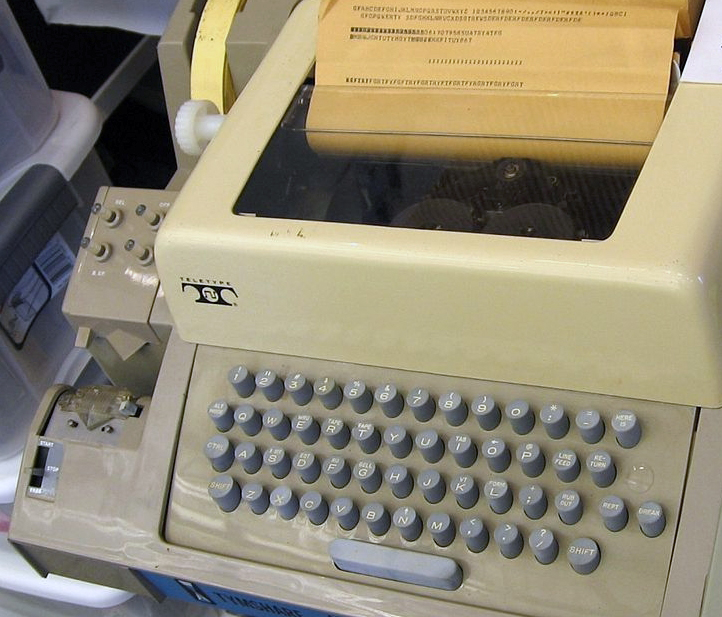
A Teletype Model 33 ASR teleprinter keyboard with punched tape reader and punch

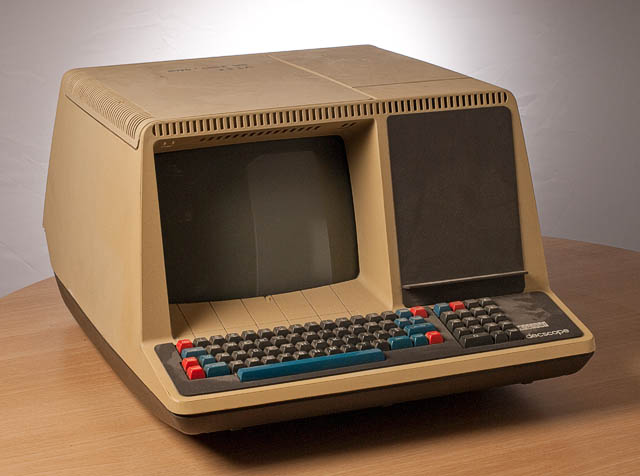
DEC VT52 terminal

The earliest computers did not support interactive input/output devices, often relying on sense switches and lights to communicate with the computer operator. This was adequate for batch systems that ran one program at a time, often with the programmer acting as operator. This also had the advantage of low overhead, since lights and switches could be tested and set with one machine instruction. Later a single system console was added to allow the operator to communicate with the system.

From the 1960s onwards, user interaction with computers was primarily by means of command-line interfaces, initially on machines like the Teletype Model 33 ASR, but then on early CRT-based computer terminals such as the VT52.

All of these devices were purely text based, with no ability to display graphics or pictures. (Note: With the exception of ASCII art.) For business application programs, text-based menus were used, but for more general interaction the command line was the interface.

Around 1964 Louis Pouzin introduced the concept and the name shell in Multics, building on earlier, simpler facilities in the Compatible Time-Sharing System (CTSS).

From the early 1970s, the Unix operating system adapted the concept of a powerful command-line environment, and introduced the ability to pipe the output of one command in as input to another. Unix also had the capability to save and re-run strings of commands as shell scripts which acted like custom commands.

The command line was also the main interface for the early home computers such as the Commodore PET, Apple II and BBC Micro – almost always in the form of a BASIC interpreter. When more powerful business-oriented microcomputers arrived with CP/M and later DOS computers such as the IBM PC, the command line began to borrow some of the syntax and features of the Unix shells such as globbing and piping of output.

The command line was first seriously challenged by the PARC GUI approach used in the 1983 Apple Lisa and the 1984 Apple Macintosh. A few computer users used GUIs such as GEOS and Windows 3.1 but the majority of IBM PC users did not replace their COMMAND.COM shell with a GUI until Windows 95 was released in 1995.

=== Modern usage as an operating system shell ===
While most non-expert computer users now use a GUI almost exclusively, more advanced users have access to powerful command-line environments:

- Unix-like systems include the Bourne shell and compatible shells such as Bash, and other Unix shells.
  - FreeBSD uses tcsh as its default interactive shell for the superuser, and ash as default scripting shell.
  - Many Linux distributions have Bash.
  - Apple macOS and some Linux distributions use zsh. Previously, macOS used tcsh and Bash.
  - Embedded Linux (and other embedded Unix-like) systems often use ash, as part of Busybox.
  - Android uses the mksh shell, which replaces a shell derived from ash that was used in older Android versions, supplemented with commands from the separate toolbox binary.
- OpenVMS uses the DIGITAL Command Language (DCL).
  - Unix command shells have been ported to OpenVMS.
- DOS and Windows have several command-line environments
  - COMMAND.COM is the command-line interpreter of MS-DOS, IBM PC DOS, and Windows 9x, as well as clones such as DR-DOS, SISNE plus, PTS-DOS, ROM-DOS, and FreeDOS.
  - Windows NT has cmd.exe, and later versions have PowerShell
  - The Windows Resource Kit and Windows Services for UNIX include Korn and the Bourne shells along with a Perl interpreter (Services for UNIX contains ActiveState ActivePerl in later versions and Interix for versions 1 and 2 and a shell compiled by Microsoft)
  - Windows users might use the CScript interface to alternate programs, from the command line. Implementations of the Unix shell are also available as part of the POSIX sub-system, Cygwin, MKS Toolkit, UWIN, Hamilton C shell and other software packages. Available shells for these interoperability tools include csh, ksh, sh, Bash, rsh, tclsh and less commonly zsh, psh
  - DCL has been ported to Windows systems at least three times, including PC-DCL and Acceler8 DCL Lite.
  - Yet another cmd.exe is a stripped-down shell for Windows CE 3.0.
  - An MS-DOS type interpreter called PocketDOS has been ported to Windows CE machines; the most recent release is almost identical to MS-DOS 6.22 and can also run Windows 1, 2, and 3.0, QBasic and other development tools, 4NT and 4DOS. The latest release includes several shells, namely MS-DOS 6.22, PC DOS 7, DR DOS 3.xx, and others.
- IBM OS/2 (and derivatives such as eComStation and ArcaOS) has the cmd.exe processor. This copies the COMMAND.COM commands, with extensions to REXX.
- Implementations of PHP have a shell for interactive use called php-cli.
- Standard Tcl/Tk has two interactive shells, Tclsh and Wish, the latter being the GUI version.
- Python, Ruby, Lua, XLNT, and other interpreters also have command shells for interactive use.
- HarmonyOS, OpenHarmony and Oniro use the commands from third-party toolbox compatibility system attached to Linux kernel of the KAL subsystem and POSIX (musl-libc) library with Linux ABI of HongMeng kernel alongside default Shell with its own native exec commands.
- Routers with Cisco IOS, Junos and many others are commonly configured from the command line.
- The Plan 9 operating system uses the rc shell, which is similar in design to the Bourne shell.

== Scripting ==
Most command-line interpreters support scripting, to various extents. They are, after all, interpreters of an interpreted programming language, albeit in many cases the language is unique to the particular command-line interpreter. They will interpret scripts, variously termed shell scripts or batch files, written in the language that they interpret. Some command-line interpreters also incorporate the interpreter engines of other languages, such as REXX, in addition to their own, allowing the execution of scripts in those languages directly within the command-line interpreter itself.

Conversely, scripting programming languages, in particular those with an eval function (such as REXX, Perl, Python, Ruby or Jython), can be used to implement command-line interpreters and filters. For a few operating systems, most notably DOS, such a command interpreter provides a more flexible command-line interface than the one supplied. In other cases, such a command interpreter can present a highly customised user interface employing the user interface and input/output facilities of the language.

== Other command-line interfaces ==
The command line provides an interface between programs as well as the user. In this sense, a command line is an alternative to a dialog box. Editors and databases present a command line, in which alternate command processors might run. On the other hand, one might have options on the command line, which opens a dialog box. The latest version of 'Take Command' has this feature. DBase used a dialog box to construct command lines, which could be further edited before use.

Programs like BASIC, diskpart, Edlin, and QBASIC all provide command-line interfaces, some of which use the system shell. BASIC is modeled on the default interface for 8-bit Intel computers. Calculators can be run as command-line or dialog interfaces.

Emacs provides a command-line interface in the form of its minibuffer. Commands and arguments can be entered using Emacs standard text editing support, and output is displayed in another buffer.

There are a number of text mode games, like Adventure or King's Quest 1-3, which relied on the user typing commands at the bottom of the screen. One controls the character by typing commands like 'get ring' or 'look'. The program returns text that describes how the character sees it, or makes the action happen. The text adventure The Hitchhiker's Guide to the Galaxy, a piece of interactive fiction based on Douglas Adams's book of the same name, is a teletype-style command-line game.

The most notable of these interfaces is the standard streams interface, which allows the output of one command to be passed to the input of another. Text files can serve either purpose as well. This provides the interfaces of piping, filters and redirection. Under Unix, devices are files too, so the normal type of file for the shell used for stdin, stdout and stderr is a "tty" device file.

Another command-line interface allows a shell program to launch helper programs, either to launch documents or start a program. The command is processed internally by the shell, and then passed on to another program to launch the document. The graphical interface of Windows and OS/2 relies heavily on command lines passed through to other programs – console or graphical, which then usually process the command line without presenting a user console.

Programs like the OS/2 E editor and some other IBM editors can process command lines normally meant for the shell, the output being placed directly in the document window.

A web browser's URL input field can be used as a command line. It can be used to launch web apps, access browser configuration, as well as perform a search. Google, which has been called "the command line of the internet" will perform a domain-specific search when it detects search parameters in a known format. This functionality is present whether the search is triggered from a browser field or on Google's website.

There are JavaScript libraries that help developers write command-line applications for the browser as standalone Web apps or as part of bigger applications. An example of such a website is the CLI interface to DuckDuckGo. There are also web-based SSH applications that allow access to a server’s command-line interface from a browser.

Many PC video games feature a command-line interface often referred to as a console. It is typically used by the game developers during development and by mod developers for debugging purposes as well as for cheating or skipping parts of the game.

== See also ==
- Comparison of command shells
- List of command-line interpreters
- Console application
- Interpreter directive
- Read–eval–print loop
- Shell script
- Run command
- Graphical user interface § Comparison to other interfaces
- In the Beginning... Was the Command Line
