= Allied Schools =

Allied Schools may refer to:

- Allied Schools (Pakistan), a school system in Pakistan
- Allied Schools (United Kingdom), an association of independent schools in the United Kingdom
- Allied Schools (United States), a for-profit secondary and post-secondary educational services company in the US

== See also ==
- Lists of schools
