= RSH =

RSH may mean:

- The former NYSE stock symbol for RadioShack
- Regulator of Social Housing
- Remote Shell, a UNIX command-line utility for remotely executing commands
- Restricted shell, a restricted shell environment for Unix
- Robert Stephenson & Hawthorns, a locomotive manufacturer
- RSHP, a British architectural firm
- Royal South Hampshire Hospital in Southampton
- Royal Shrewsbury Hospital in Shrewsbury
- The graffiti tag of artist Raymond Salvatore Harmon
- R-SH, within organic chemistry, the notation used for a compound also known as Thiol
- The Russian Mission Airport in Alaska, United States
