= Uster (disambiguation) =

Uster is a city and municipality in the canton of Zürich in Switzerland.

Uster may also refer to:

- Uster Castle, in the city of Uster
- Uster Reformed Church, in the city of Uster
- Uster (district), a district in the canton of Zürich
- Uster Technologies, a company in the city of Uster
- Usteria, a plant genus in the family Loganiaceae
- Timo Uster (born 1974), a Gambian footballer

== See also ==
- User (disambiguation)
- Ulster (disambiguation)
