= Using =

Using may refer to:

== Programming language keywords ==
- In C++, for alias declarations
- In C++, for using directives
- In C++, for using enum declarations
- In C#, for using directives
- In TypeScript, for using declarations

== Other uses ==
- Using Daeng Rangka (c. 1845–1927), a Makassan fisherman who had contact with Aboriginal Australians
- U-Sing, a 2009 video game developed by Mindscape.

== See also ==
- Use (disambiguation)
