= Verbose mode =

Output option in some software programs

In computing, Verbose mode is an option available in many computer operating systems and programming languages that provides additional details as to what the computer is doing and what drivers and software it is loading during startup. Used as a flag in a computer program, it produces detailed output for diagnostic purposes thus making it easier to debug.

When running programs in the command line, verbose output is typically output in standard output or standard error.

Many command line programs, such as cURL or Bash, can be set to verbose mode by using a flag, such as -v or --verbose.
