= Used =

Used may refer to:

== Common meanings ==
- Used good, goods of any type that have been used before or pre-owned
- Used to, English auxiliary verb

== Places ==
- Used, Huesca, a village in Huesca, Aragon, Spain
- Used, Zaragoza, a town in Zaragoza, Aragon, Spain

== Music ==
- "Used" (song), a song by Rocket from the Crypt from Scream, Dracula, Scream!, 1995
- "Used", a song by SZA from SOS, 2022
- The Used, a rock band from Orem, Utah
- The Used (album), their 2002 debut album

== See also ==
- Use (disambiguation)
