= USE =

USE or U.S.E. may refer to:

- United States of Europe, hypothetical scenario of a single sovereign country in Europe
- United State of Electronica, an American rock band
  - U.S.E. (album), by United State of Electronica
- Uganda Securities Exchange, the principal stock exchange in Uganda
- USE Method, a systems performance methodology by Brendan Gregg
- Unified State Exam, a series of university entrance exams in Russia
- Unserved energy, an electric grid reliability index

== See also ==
- Use (disambiguation)
