= Getopts =

Standard UNIX utility for parsing arguments sent from the command-line

getopts
- Developer(s): Various open-source and commercial developers
- Initial release: 1986; 39 years ago
- Operating system: Unix, Unix-like, IBM i
- Type: Command

getopts is a built-in Unix shell command for parsing command-line arguments. It is designed to process command line arguments that follow the POSIX Utility Syntax Guidelines, based on the C interface of getopt.

The predecessor to getopts was the external program getopt by Unix System Laboratories.

== History ==
The original getopt had several problems: it could not handle whitespace or shell metacharacters in arguments, and there was no ability to disable the output of error messages.

getopts was first introduced in 1986 in the Bourne shell shipped with Unix SVR3. It uses the shell's own variables to track the position of current and argument positions, OPTIND and OPTARG, and returns the option name in a shell variable. Earlier versions of the Bourne shell did not have getopts.

In 1995, getopts was included in the Single UNIX Specification version 1 / X/Open Portability Guidelines Issue 4. As a result, getopts is now available in shells including the Bourne shell, KornShell, Almquist shell, Bash and Zsh.

The getopts command has also been ported to the IBM i operating system.

The modern usage of getopt was partially revived mainly due to an enhanced implementation in util-linux. This version, based on the BSD getopt, not only fixed the two complaints around the old getopt, but also introduced the capability for parsing GNU-style long options and optional arguments for options, features that getopts lacks. The various BSD distributions, however, stuck to the old implementation.

== Usage ==
The usage synopsis of getopt and getopts is similar to its C sibling:

getopt optstring [parameters]
getopts optstring varname [parameters]

- The optstring part has the same format as the C sibling.
- The parameters part simply accepts whatever one wants getopt to parse. A common value is all the parameters, "$@" in POSIX shell.
  - This value exists in getopts but is rarely used, since it can just access the shell's parameters. It is useful with resetting the parser, however.
- The varname part of getopts names a shell variable to store the option parsed into.

The way one uses the commands however varies a lot:

- getopt simply returns a flat string containing whitespace-separated tokens representing the "normalized" argument. One then uses a while-loop to parse it natively.
- getopts is meant to be repeatedly called like the C getopt. When it hits the end of arguments, it returns 1 (shell false).

== Enhancements ==
=== In various getopts ===
In spring 2004 (Solaris 10 beta development), the libc implementation for getopt() was enhanced to support long options. As a result, this new feature was also available in the built-in command getopts of the Bourne Shell. This is triggered by parenthesized suffixes in the optstring specifying long aliases.

KornShell and Zsh both have an extension for long arguments. The former is defined as in Solaris, while the latter is implemented via a separate zparseopts command.

KornShell additionally implements optstring extensions for options beginning with + instead of -.

=== In Linux getopt ===
An alternative to getopts is the Linux enhanced version of getopt, the external command line program.

The Linux enhanced version of getopt has the extra safety of getopts plus more advanced features. It supports long option names (e.g. --help) and the options do not have to appear before all the operands (e.g. command operand1 operand2 -a operand3 -b is permitted by the Linux enhanced version of getopt but does not work with getopts). It also supports escaping metacharacters for shells (like tcsh and POSIX sh) and optional arguments.

=== Comparison ===
Program Feature	POSIX getopts	Solaris/ksh getopts	Unix/BSD getopt	Linux getopt
Splits options for easy parsing	Yes	Yes	Yes	Yes
Allows suppressing error messages	Yes	Yes	No	Yes
Safe with whitespace and metacharacters	Yes	Yes	No	Yes
Allows operands to be mixed with options	No	Yes	No	Yes
Supports long options	Emulation	Yes	No	Yes
Optional arguments	Error handling	Error handling	No	Yes

== Examples ==
Suppose we are building a Wikipedia downloader in bash that takes three options and zero extra arguments:

wpdown -a article name -l [language] -v

When possible, we allow the following long arguments:

-a   --article
-l   --language, --lang
-v   --verbose

For clarity, no help text is included, and we assume there is a program that downloads any webpage. In addition, all programs are of the form:

#!/bin/bash
verbose=0
article=
lang=en

# [EXAMPLE HERE]

if ((verbose > 2)); then
  printf '%s\n' 'Non-option arguments:'
  printf '%q ' "${remaining[@]]}"
fi

if ((verbose > 1)); then
  printf 'Downloading %s:%s\n' "$lang" "$article"
fi

if [[ ! $article ]]; then
  printf '%s\n' "No articles!" >&2
  exit 1
fi

save_webpage "https://${lang}.wikipedia.org/wiki/${article}"

=== Using old getopt ===
The old getopt does not support optional arguments:

# parse everything; if it fails we bail
args=`getopt 'a:l:v' $*` || exit
# now we have the sanitized args... replace the original with it
set -- $args

while true; do
    case $1 in
      (-v)   ((verbose++));  shift;;
      (-a)   article=$2; shift 2;;
      (-l)   lang=$2; shift 2;;
      (--)   shift; break;;
      (*)    exit 1;;           # error
    esac
done

remaining=("$@")

This script will also break with any article title with a space or a shell metacharacter (like ? or *) in it.

=== Using getopts ===
Getopts give the script the look and feel of the C interface, although in POSIX optional arguments are still absent:

#!/bin/sh
while getopts ':a:l:v' opt; do
    case $opt in
      (v)   ((verbose++));;
      (a)   article=$OPTARG;;
      (l)   lang=$OPTARG;;
      (:)   # "optional arguments" (missing option-argument handling)
            case $OPTARG in
              (a) exit 1;; # error, according to our syntax
              (l) :;;      # acceptable but does nothing
            esac;;
    esac
done

shift "$((OPTIND - 1))"
# remaining is "$@"

Since we are no longer operating on shell options directly, we no longer need to shift them within the loop. However, a slicing operation is required to remove the parsed options and leave the remaining arguments.

It is fairly simple to emulate long option support of flags by treating --fast as an argument fast to an option -. That is, -: is added to the optstring, and - is added as a case for opt, within which OPTARG is evaluated for a match to fast. Supporting long options with an argument is more tedious, but is possible when the options and arguments are delineated by =.

=== Using Linux getopt ===
Linux getopt escapes its output and an "eval" command is needed to have the shell interpret it. The rest is unchanged:

#!/bin/bash

# We use "${@}" instead of "${*}" to preserve argument-boundary information
args=$(getopt --options 'a:l::v' --longoptions 'article:,lang::,language::,verbose' -- "${@}") || exit
eval "set -- ${args}"

while true; do
    case "${1}" in
        (-v | --verbose)
            ((verbose++))
            shift
        ;;
        (-a | --article)
            article=${2}
            shift 2
        ;;
        (-l | --lang | --language)
            # handle optional: getopt normalizes it into an empty string
            if [[ -n ${2} ]] ; then
                lang=${2}
            fi
            shift 2
        ;;
        (--)
            shift
            break
        ;;
        (*)
            exit 1    # error
        ;;
    esac
done

remaining_args=("${@}")

== See also ==
- List of Unix commands
