= User =

User may refer to:

- User (ancient Egyptian official), an ancient Egyptian nomarch (governor) of the Eighth Dynasty
- User or Useramen, an ancient Egyptian vizier from the 18th Dynasty
- User (computing), a person (or software) using an information system
- User (telecommunications), an entity using a telecommunications system
- "Users", a song from the album Heartworm by Whipping Boy

== See also ==
- Drug user (disambiguation), a person who uses drugs
- End user, a user of a commercial product or service
- USSR
