= Usage perspective development =

Type of development process

Usage perspective development, UPD, describes a procedure from human factors and ergonomics, which analyses and integrates the user requirements already at the beginning of the development process and thus uses them to develop innovative socio-technical solutions. To accomplish this, the user needs are identified along the usage chain of a technical product, and subsequently used for the requirements that allow a current state evaluation and a target definition.

== Approach ==
Usage-centred development is based in the assumption that the use of technical products, services and systems (subsequently referred to as products) already need to be taken into account in the Fuzzy Front End (Herstatt, Verworn, 2007) in order to design effective, efficient and exciting solutions. So far, existing models and approaches, such as the Value chain (after Michael Porter or product development according to customer centricity, User-centered design or Design thinking neglect the identified phases (development, production, sales & services, recycling) as well as the usage phase. These approaches regard product development mostly from an economic or aesthetic point of view. The usage structure in particular has not been further investigated or specified. The usage perspective engineering approach identifies the respective usage-centred requirements along the usage chain. It already focuses them as part of the requirements definition in the early development stages, in addition to the still valid criteria for decision processes, such as technical, internal and aesthetic possibilities. The usage phase is defined as an individual, essential aspect and is integrated as a process into the value chain.

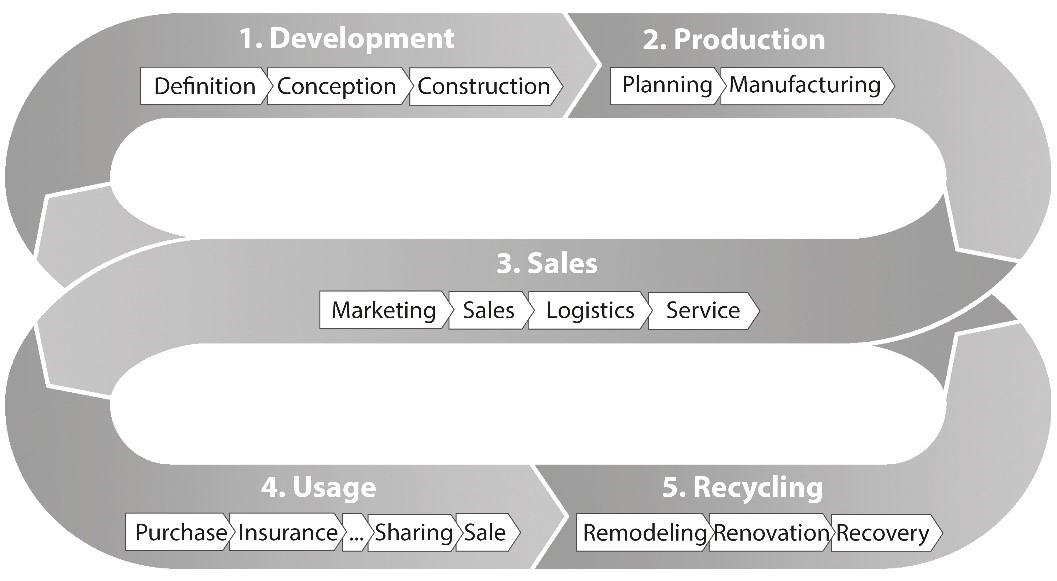
Usage chain in the product-life cycle

The usage phases, also called usage categories, contain the individual, separate topics of using socio-technical products that should be included in the conception.

The approach depicts the relevant actors and contents by means of the user interaction with various aspects of the product life-cycle. As the structured usage processes allow a derivation of relevant use scenarios, the criteria catalogue can already be comprehensively and efficiently defined in the fuzzy front end. The inclusion of user needs is meant to prevent engineers from developing only from their own specific perspective. The aim is the identification and consistent consideration of user needs in early development stages to increase the usability and user appeal of the product.

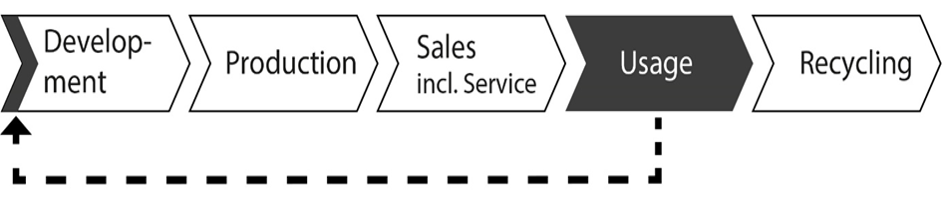
Usage chain in the fuzzy front end

== Criticism and differentiation ==
=== Established approaches ===
The lead user method integrates the trend leading user into product developments, but its limitations become obvious in the context of increasingly complex products. Lead users need to understand the complex context of the development to realise why something is possible or not. Furthermore, the great organisational effort and the processing of such huge amounts of information delay the product launch. It can also result in concentrating on niche solutions that are not suitable for the masses or a compulsive need to differentiate from competitors by using all kind of parameters, such as function, design or business models.

In recent years, design thinking has become the preferred method in the product and service development of innovative companies. Its aim is to create solutions that are not firmly defined at the beginning of the development process by using principles that increase creativity. Some examples of the principles and basic ideas of the method are its user focus, specific approach to problem solving, visualisations, basic joy in experimentation and team diversity.

=== Differences ===
Usage perspective development, i.e. usage-centred, multi-perspective product development, differentiates from existing approaches, such as lead user, design thinking or customer centricity, by the following aspects:

The approach acknowledges the issues of the lead user or the vertical diversification, takes up and enhances various elements of design thinking, and – deviating from previous approaches – always takes the use of socio-technical products as its premise. Training, detailed information (market research, roles or persona and user journeys) and interdisciplinary cooperation should allow product developers to become aware of how and for what the development is going to be used, and to regard its usage from all relevant perspectives. This form of consideration helps to establish a useful diversity in the early phases of the product development that is not influenced by hierarchies and battles for position. Additionally, UPD follows a normative process – in contrast to design thinking etc. that consider its procedures as non-binding guidelines that don't limit innovation potentials. Based on the stringent usage-centred inclusion of all potential requirements from various perspectives, the engineers try to ensure technical feasibility, market acceptance and unique selling propositions. Considering the separate usage phases from various perspectives is an important aspect. The phases are subsequently used for scenarios to form role-based use cases that are weighted by quality and quantity criteria. Thus, the so-called main use cases emerge, which are needed for accomplishing a minimum of acceptance. It is necessary to identify all possible use cases, all perspectives and scenarios to identify the market acceptance as well as beneficial potentials by combining all detected variables. Simultaneously, product demands on the user should be minimised in order to create accessible and low-threshold solutions.

The usage perspective development approach assumes that the derivation of all relevant requirements and useful potentials also already contributes to the design of the business model in early phases.

== Practical application ==
The usage-perspective development approach allows the definition of requirements according to the context of use. This results in a comprehensive criteria catalogue that can be used as a guideline or a reference source for the conception as well as for decision processes in the further course of the development. The approach is designed for an application in product, system and service developments.

== Proof of concept - electric mobility services ==
Usage phases in the context of electric mobility were generated, generalised and evaluated with the objective to develop a procedure with universal use for product developments. Based on an empirical study conducted with electric mobility users, the usage phases were hypothetically defined with a deductive-nomological model, and validated with usage-oriented development projects, focus groups etc.

== Objective ==
The aim of the approach is to allow developers a reliable and repeatable definition of requirements as well as an identification of useful potentials. This should open a new perspective on the development of user-friendly and useful product solutions, and prevent developments from a mere corporate and/or specialist's point of view. The objective is the development of product with increased usability and the implementation of efficient development processes.

== Application in an educational context ==
It is planned to create a new educational concept based on the usage-perspective development approach. The objective is an innovateur education. This innovateur is able to develop or refine inventions and innovations as well as to evaluate according to usage-centred and market relevant criteria.

== See also ==
- Front end innovation
- Interaction design
- Usability
- User experience
- User-centered design
