= Useless =

Useless may refer to:

== Film and television ==
- Useless (film), a 2007 Chinese documentary by Jia Zhangke
- "Useless", an episode of the 2024 miniseries Manhunt

== Music ==
=== Albums ===
- Useless (EP), by Unloco, 2000

=== Songs ===
- "Useless" (song), by Depeche Mode, 1997
- "Useless", by Big Wreck from Grace Street, 2017
- "Useless", by Cavo from Bright Nights Dark Days, 2009
- "Useless", by Faster Pussycat from The Power and the Glory Hole, 2006
- "Useless", by Hood, 1997
- "Useless", by Ministry from Filth Pig, 1996
- "Useless", by Myka Relocate from Lies to Light the Way, 2013
- "Useless (I Don't Need You Now)", by Kym Mazelle, 1988
- "Useless (The Little Horse That Didn't Grow)", by Waylon Jennings from Cowboys, Sisters, Rascals & Dirt, 1993
- "Inútil" ("Useless"), from the musical In the Heights
