= Allegation of use =

An allegation of use is a necessary filing in the prosecution of an intent to use (ITU) trademark application in the United States.

== Background ==
An AOU can come in the form of an amendment to allege use or a statement of use. In the United States system, a person may file an application for a trademark that the applicant intends to use, but is not currently using in commerce. In order to convert the ITU application into an actual use application, thereby enjoying the full benefit of a U.S. registration, the applicant must file an acceptable AOU within three years of the application clearing examination by the U.S. Patent and Trademark Office (USPTO). An acceptable AOU includes a declaration signed by the applicant or his or her representative that states that the trademark is currently in use. The AOU must also include specimens that show the trademark being used in commerce in connection with the goods or services identified in the application. Once the USPTO accepts an AOU, the application is converted into an actual use registration, with the filing date of the ITU application as the priority date or the date of first use.
