= Substance control =

Substance control may refer to:

- Controlled substance
- Controlled Substances Act
- Drug prohibition
- Misuse of Drugs Act (disambiguation)
- Regulation of chemicals

== See also ==
- Substance use (disambiguation)
