= Use-centered design =

Design philosophy with focus on goals and tasks

Use-centered design is a design philosophy in which the focus is on the goals and tasks associated with skill performance in specific work or problem domains, in contrast to a user-centered design approach, where the focus is on the needs, wants, and limitations of the end user of the designed artifact.

Bennett and Flach (2011) have drawn a contrast between dyadic and triadic approaches to the semiotics of display design. The classical 'user-centered' approach is based on a dyadic semiotic model where the focus is on the human-interface dyad. This approach frames 'meaning' as a process of interpreting the symbolic representation. That is, meaning is constructed from internal information processes. From this dyadic perspective, the design goal is to build interfaces that 'match' the users internal model (i.e., match user expectations).

In contrast, the 'use-centered' approach is based on a triadic semiotic model that includes the work domain (or ecology) as a third component of the semiotic system. In the triadic system, the work domain provides a ground for meaning outside of the human information processing system. In this, triadic semiotic system, the focus is on the match between the constraints in the work domain and the mental representations. From this 'use-centered' approach the goal is to design displays that 'shape' the internal mental representations so that they reflect validated models of the work domain. In other words, the goal is to shape user expectations to conform with the validated 'deep structure' of the work domain. In doing this, work analysis (e.g., Vicente 1999) and multi-level means ends representations of work domain constraints (i.e., Rasmussen's Abstraction Hierarchy) are the typical methods used to specify the 'deep structure' of a work domain. By building configural display representations that conform to this deep structure -- it is possible to facilitate skilled interactions between the human and the work domain.

Thus, an emphasis on 'use' rather than 'user' suggests a more problem-centered focus for interface design. Note that it remains important to respect the real limitations of human information processing systems through the use of graphical displays that support efficient chunking of information. However, the main point is that the organization MUST be consistent with the demands of the work or problem domain, if the interactions that result are expected to be skillful. In the end, the representations must be 'grounded' in the use-domain!

Charles Sanders Peirce is the inspiration for the triadic model of semiotics. Peirce was interested in the fixation of belief relative to pragmatic demands of everyday experiences. Peirce also introduced the construct of 'abduction' as an alternative to classical logic (deduction and induction). The 'use-centered' approach assumes abduction as the appropriate model for problem solving. Thus, use-centered design focuses on supporting the closed-loop dynamic of learning from experience. That is, by acting on hypotheses and simultaneously testing those hypotheses in terms of the practical consequences of the actions that they guide. The convergence, stability, and robustness of abduction processes depend critically on the information coupling between perception and action. When the coupling is rich an abduction system will typically converge on 'beliefs' that lead to pragmatically successful (i.e., satisfying) interactions (i.e., skilled interactions). This is the ultimate goal of use-centered design - to support skilled interactions between a person and a work domain.

The term use-centered design was coined by Flach and Dominguez.

== See also ==
- Ergonomics
- Form follows function
- Understanding by Design
- Utilitarianism
