= Amendment to allege use =

Amendment to allege use or AAU is a sworn statement signed by an entity wishing to register a trademark or service mark attesting to use of the mark in commerce. With the amendment to allege use, the owner must submit one product specimen that makes commercial use of the mark for each class of goods or services included in the application.

Amendments to allege use were first created by the Trademark Law Revision Act of 1988, which amended the Lanham Act.

The United States Patent and Trademark Office originally assumed there would be an amendment to allege use in 50% of cases. In the financial year of 1991, there was an amendment to allege use in 2.9% of cases. In 1992 and 1993, it was reported that there was an amendment to allege use in 5% of cases. The IPL Newsletter of the American Bar Association expressed approval for the low number of amendments to allege use.

As of 2018, most amendments to allege use are sent to the United States Patent and Trademark Office by the Trademark Electronic Application System.

Amendment to allege use were criticised by the IPL Newsletter.

== See also ==
- Allegation of use
