= Restricted shell =

The restricted shell is a Unix shell that restricts some of the capabilities available to an interactive user session, or to a shell script, running within it. It is intended to provide an additional layer of security, but is insufficient to prevent execution of entirely untrusted software. A restricted mode operation is found in the original Bourne shell and its later counterpart Bash, and in the KornShell. In some cases a restricted shell is used in conjunction with a chroot jail, in a further attempt to limit access to the system as a whole.

== Invocation ==
The restricted mode of the Bourne shell sh, and its POSIX workalikes, is used when the interpreter is invoked in one of the following ways:

- sh -r note that this conflicts with the "read" option in some sh variants
- rsh note that this may conflict with the remote shell command, which is also called rsh on some systems

The restricted mode of Bash is used when Bash is invoked in one of the following ways:

- rbash
- bash -r
- bash --restricted

Similarly KornShell's restricted mode is produced by invoking it thus:

- rksh
- ksh -r

=== Setting up rbash ===
For some systems (e.g., CentOS), the invocation through rbash is not enabled by default, and the user obtains a command not found error if invoked directly, or a login failure if the /etc/passwd file indicates /bin/rbash as the user's shell.

It suffices to create a link named rbash pointing directly to bash. Though this invokes Bash directly, without the -r or --restricted options, Bash does recognize that it was invoked through rbash and it does come up as a restricted shell.

This can be accomplished with the following simple commands (executed as root, either logged in as user root, or using sudo):

root@host:~# cd /bin
root@host:/bin# ln bash rbash

== Limited operations ==
The following operations are not permitted in a restricted shell:

- changing directory
- specifying absolute pathnames or names containing a slash
- setting the PATH or SHELL variable
- redirection of output

Bash adds further restrictions, including:

- limitations on function definitions
- limitations on the use of slash-ed filenames in Bash builtins

Restrictions in the restricted KornShell are much the same as those in the restricted Bourne shell.

== Weaknesses of a restricted shell ==
The restricted shell is not secure. A user can break out of the restricted environment by running a program that features a shell function. The following is an example of the shell function in vi being used to escape from the restricted shell:

user@host:~$ vi

:set shell=/bin/sh
:shell

Or by simply starting a new unrestricted shell, if it is in the PATH, as demonstrated here:

user@host:~$ rbash
user@host:~$ cd /
rbash: cd: restricted
user@host:~$ bash
user@host:~$ cd /
user@host:/$

== List of programs ==
Beyond the restricted modes of usual shells, specialized restricted shell programs include:

- rssh – used with OpenSSH, permitting only certain file copying programs, namely scp, sftp, rsync, cvs, and rdist
- smrsh, which limits the commands sendmail can invoke

== See also ==
- Remote Shell
