= Drug use =

Drug use may refer to any drug use; or:

- Entheogen
- Performance-enhancing substance
- Medication
- Polysubstance use
- Polysubstance dependence
- Recreational drug use
- Self-medication
- Substance abuse
- Substance dependence

== See also ==
- Drug injection
- Drug policy of Portugal
- East African drug trade
- Golden Triangle (Southeast Asia)
- History of United States drug prohibition
- Illegal drug trade
- Prohibition of drugs
- War on drugs
