= Allied Schools (United States) =

American educational services company

- Type: for-profit
- Industry: Distance Education
- Genre: Distance Education, e-Learning
- Founded: 1992
- Headquarters: USA, Laguna Hills, California

Allied Schools is a for-profit post-secondary educational services company founded in 1992. The company markets its certificate courses to working professionals, stay-at-home parents, military service members and disabled individuals to obtain training and credentials for career advancement, professional development or personal growth through distance education.

== History ==
Allied Schools began in 1979 through Ashley Crown Systems, Inc., a publishing company providing services for education vendors. In 1992, Allied Schools developed vocational training courses through distance learning platforms starting in the real estate industry. By January 1996, Allied Schools launched a fully integrated online school website, complete with an in-house developed student learning platform. Allied American University, a higher education division of Allied Schools, operated from 2008 to 2016.

== Online Courses ==
=== Real Estate ===
- Real Estate Licensing
- Real Estate Broker Licensing
- Real Estate Appraisal Licensing
- 7-hr National USPAP
- 15-hr National USPAP
- Real Estate Salesperson Renewal/Continuing Education
- Real Estate Broker Renewal
- Online Notary Public Course
- Real Estate Appraisal Renewal
- SAFE Mortgage Loan Originator Licensing
- SAFE Continuing Education
- Property Management
- Home Inspection
- California Contractor's Licensing

== See also ==
- List of colleges and universities in California
