= Substance use =

Substance use may refer to:

- Generally speaking, the application of a chemical substance, in particular a drug
- Substance use disorder, the continued use of a drug in spite of detrimental effects
  - Substance abuse, a typical expression of substance use disorder

== See also ==
- Substance control (disambiguation)
