= Internet Explorer shell =

Programs based on the Internet Explorer browser engine

An Internet Explorer shell is a class of computer program (web browser or otherwise) that uses the Internet Explorer browser engine, known as MSHTML and previously Trident. This engine is closed-source, but Microsoft has exposed an application programming interface (API) that permits the developers to instantiate either MSHTML or a full-fledged chromeless Internet Explorer (known as the WebBrowser control) within the graphical user interface of their software.

== Web browsers ==
These applications supplement some of the usual user interface components of Internet Explorer (IE) for browsing, adding features such as popup blocking and tabbed browsing. For example, MSN Explorer can be considered an Internet Explorer shell, in that it is essentially an expansion of IE with added MSN-related functionality. A more complete list of MSHTML-based browsers can be found under the list of web browsers.

Actively maintained:

- IE Tab
- Lunascape
- Maxthon (formerly MyIE2)
- MSN Explorer
- Sleipnir
- SlimBrowser
- Tencent Traveler

Discontinued:

- AOL Explorer
- Deepnet Explorer
- GreenBrowser
- MSN Program Viewer
- NeoPlanet
- NetCaptor
- Netscape Browser 8.x

== Non-browser shells ==
Other applications that are not primarily for web browsing, such as Intuit's Quicken and QuickBooks, AOL, Winamp, and RealPlayer, use the rendering engine to provide a limited-functionality "mini" browser within their own user interfaces.

On Windows, components of Internet Explorer are also used in Windows Explorer, the operating system shell that provides the default file system browsing and desktop services. For example, folder views in Windows Explorer on versions of Windows prior to Windows XP utilize IE's DHTML processing abilities; they are essentially little web pages. Active Desktop technology is another example.

MSHTML was, until Outlook 2007, also used to render HTML portions of email messages in Microsoft Outlook and Outlook Express email clients (Outlook 2007 now uses Microsoft Word to render HTML e-mail). This integration is an often-exploited "back door", since the Internet Explorer components make available more of the functionality within the HTML code.

Microsoft Windows also supports HTML Applications, computer programs written in HTML, CSS and JavaScript and bear a .hta filename extension. They run with HTML Application Host, which is a plain Internet Explorer shell without any GUI elements around it.

== See also ==
- Browser Helper Object: another way of customizing Internet Explorer's look and feel
