= Rogers Xfinity Internet =

Canadian Internet service provider

- Type: Division of Rogers Cable
- Industry: Internet service provider
- Founded: November 28, 1995
- Headquarters: Toronto, Ontario, Canada
- Products: Cable Internet, Email, FTTH
- Owner: Rogers Communications
- Website: rogers.com/internet

Rogers Xfinity Internet, or simply Rogers Xfinity, is the branding for the broadband Internet service provider operations of Rogers Cable in Canada. Rogers previously operated under the brand names Rogers@Home, Rogers Yahoo! Hi-Speed Internet, Rogers Hi-Speed Internet, WAVE, and Road Runner in Newfoundland. It is currently the second largest Internet provider in Canada, after Bell Internet, by customer count.

Rogers began offering high-speed internet service in November 1995, with the first market being Newmarket, Ontario. By 2000, it offered services in Ontario and British Columbia. Services were known as Rogers Ignite from 2015 to 2024, when the Xfinity brand came to Canada as part of a technology licensing agreement with U.S. cable provider Comcast.

== History ==
=== 1990s: Early years ===
Rogers' started high speed internet service as a way to aid remote workers.

The Rogers' cable home Internet network was first launched on November 28, 1995, and was available to about 16,000 homes in Newmarket, Ontario. The service was branded WAVE. It was North America's first cable Internet service.

=== 2000s: Growth and relationship with Yahoo! ===
By the year 2000, the service was rebranded to Rogers@Home and availability was extended to more cities in Ontario and British Columbia.

In 2004, Rogers partnered with Yahoo! to offer Rogers Yahoo! Hi-Speed Internet to its members. This included service offers unlimited e-mail storage, plus access to Premium Yahoo! Services at no charge, including a Flickr PRO account. Customers with websites previously hosted by Rogers were offered the option of transferring to ca.geocities.com addresses. (Unike regular GeoCities websites, these were ad-free for existing accounts, although those for new customers had drop-down ads.) All such websites were discontinued with the closure of GeoCities on 27 October 2009. Although still partnered with Yahoo!, Rogers dropped Yahoo! from its services name in 2008.

In mid-2009, Rogers discontinued giving free Flickr Pro accounts to all Rogers customers and switched all accounts to the free version while allowing old pictures and videos to be stored even though it was over the allowed limit. Rogers Mail accounts continue to be provided by Yahoo!.

=== 2010s: DOCSIS 3, fibre to the home (FTTH) and price increases ===
On January 16, 2012, customer advocacy blog Stop The Cap! reported that Rogers increased the price of all its cable Internet services by $2, except for Lite and Ultra-Lite which remain unchanged. Rogers blames its slightly higher cap limits and its SpeedBoost technology as reasons for the price increase. A customer, however, was quick to point out that the cable company "introduced 'SpeedBoost' as a 'free' feature which we are now apparently/effectively going to pay more for".

A few days later, Stop The Cap! reported that DOCSIS 3.0 customers would benefit from a speed and usage increase. By February 21, Express speeds of up to 12 Mbit/s would now be up to 18 Mbit/s, while Extreme speeds of up to 24 Mbit/s would be increased to 28 Mbit/s. Also, Ultimate speeds of up to 50 Mbit/s would now be up to 75 Mbit/s. On March 8, data allowances for each plan would be increased by 10 GB and 20 GB, respectively. In August 2012, Rogers doubled speeds on its Lite plan from 3 Mbit/s to 6 Mbit/s. It also increased its usage caps from 15 GB to 20 GB.

On August 1, 2012, Rogers started the availability of an unadvertised Ultimate tier which offers 150 Mbit/s of download speed and 10 Mbit/s of upload speed. Currently being implemented within the GTA area, the company plans to extend this service's availability to the rest of Ontario by the end of 2012. Customers with the older Ultimate tier will be informed when the new tier is available.

Rogers introduced fibre to the home (FTTH) residential internet service in 2012. It is only available is select areas of Toronto, ON and Moncton, NB.

In March 2015, Rogers introduced a streamlined package structure, known as Rogers Ignite. The Ignite packages are aimed primarily towards streaming media, with the majority of the packages offering no usage caps. In October 2015, Rogers launched Ignite Gigabit Internet, which supports 4K resolution streaming to Rogers Cable NextBox 4K receivers.

In November 2015, Rogers launched a Fido-branded home internet service in its Ontario markets, offering a 30 Mbit/s package with a 300 GB bandwidth cap, and discounts for Fido mobile customers.

=== 2020s: Rogers Xfinity Internet ===
Rogers then announced a deeper technology partnership with Comcast in April 2024, and began rebranding its Ignite products as "Rogers Xfinity" later that year.

== Services ==
Rogers offers cable Internet using the Data Over Cable Service Interface Specification (DOCSIS) standard. They also offer value-added services such as Internet security computer software.

=== Cable Internet ===
Cable Internet from Rogers is branded as "Hybrid Fibre", to indicate that on the coaxial cable in customers' homes, the frequencies used for Internet service are separate from those used for Rogers' cable television service. Available at a variety of speeds, from Lite (10 Mbit/s down, 1 Mbit/s up) to Ultimate (250 Mbit/s down, 20 Mbit/s up) tiers. Rogers Hi-Speed Internet Ultimate Fibre's speeds are 350 Mbit/s down and 350 Mbit/s up. Rogers Hi-Speed Ultimate and Ultimate Fibre's usage caps had been increased dramatically to 1 TB/month and 2 TB/month respectively.

Those who do not subscribe to television services from Rogers cannot access most analog cable channels. Channels 2 to 6, however, can be legally watched without a subscription. These channels are also available over the air, with the exception of the TV guide on channel 4.

Rogers Hi-Speed Internet users may be warned, through their browser via Rogers-injected code, that they have reached 75% or 100% of their monthly limit. This message explains that there will be charges for additional usage after the 100% warning for exceeding their limit. The overcharge fees are charged on a per-gigabyte basis, rounded down to the nearest gigabyte. Overage costs as low as $0.50 for the high-end Ultimate plan, but costs as much as $4.00 for the low-end Lite plan. All plans except for Lite are DOCSIS 3.0 compatible.

=== Fibre Internet (FTTH) ===
Rogers confirmed that it is using fibre-to-the-home (FTTH) to power a new broadband service tier that provides upload and download speeds of up to 350 Mbit/s (symmetric). The tier, called Rogers Ultimate Fibre Internet, is currently available only in parts of Toronto and the MSO's Atlantic region, which includes Moncton. According to Rogers, this is not a beta but in fact a first market rollout of fibre to the home service; meaning rogers is likely to expand this to other areas. The service comes with a monthly 2-terabyte usage limit. Pricing is listed at $225.99 CAD per month as of October 30, 2013. This new service is based on GPON.

=== Security ===
While previously offering Norton Internet Security, Rogers switched to offering Rogers Online Protection. It contains anti-virus/spyware, parent/privacy control and firewall features. A cutoff time of June 30, 2009 was set for people to switch from their previous protections to this new one.

The security suite is distributed for free with basic services, such as antivirus, antispyware, firewall, and parental controls, while premium services, at an additional cost, include PC optimizing tools, identity theft protection, wireless security services, and backup services. The security suite only supports Microsoft Windows operating systems.

=== Legacy services ===
Rogers previously offered a Portable Internet service in select rural regions, similarly to its competitor Bell Internet. These services used the Inukshuk Wireless network. The company is no longer accepting subscriptions to this service, as they plan to discontinue the service on March 1, 2012. Customers are encouraged to use Rogers Wireless Internet services instead, which generally offer a much lower bandwidth cap.

== Criticism ==
Rogers has been criticised for traffic redirection and inspection. They use deep packet inspection to identify and throttle BitTorrent traffic. and use website address errors (failed DNS lookups) to redirect traffic to their search portal. They have also made a controversial move to display advertisements in webmail despite users having to pay for the service (usually in paid web-apps, there is no advertising).

=== Throttling ===
BitTorrent traffic was restricted through bandwidth throttling using the SCE-2020, and in later years, the SCE-8000 from Cisco Systems Inc, which had caused complaints as users felt Rogers was overstepping their bounds as a service provider and despite Rogers advertising their service "for sharing large files and much more". Rogers had previously denied such allegations, despite widespread reports of the issue. Further controversy arose when in May 2007, Rogers began throttling all encrypted file transfers allegedly to combat BitTorrent traffic, but affecting all encrypted transfers regardless if they are BitTorrent traffic or not.

In January 2011, the CRTC issued a letter to Rogers stating it was breaking CRTC policy by not "indicat[ing] that there are circumstances whereby the Rogers ITMP will also affect download speeds available to subscribers." Despite the letter from the CRTC, Rogers still had not updated their policy pages as of February 4, 2011, and continued throttling all non-whitelisted internet traffic (no longer just P2P) for up to 15 minutes after P2P had been disabled. Several games had been caught up in this more restrictive throttling as Rogers was incorrectly detecting them as P2P, and had also been slow to fix it despite offers of assistance from customers, and game manufacturers.

On May 31, 2011, Rogers filed that they had resolved the World of Warcraft throttling, however they had only resolved it on their testing equipment, as users were still experiencing throttling. This resulted in the CRTC ordering testing done by Rogers, and the CRTC providing the complainant (Teresa Murphy) a redacted copy of the Rogers testing. On September 22, 2011, the CRTC released Telecom Information Bulletin CRTC 2011-609, which set out new steps for complaints, and allowed for the World of Warcraft complaint to be sent to the CRTC Enforcements division. While the World of Warcraft complaint was then closed as it was resolved, the creators of the WoW complaint created a new one, which was then sent to Enforcements division, who then began looking into Rogers' throttling practices, and found additional non-compliance.

After Bell announced they were ending throttling in December 2011, and the CRTC Enforcement division finding another violation of CRTC throttling policy in January 2012, Rogers announced on Feb 6, 2012 that they were ending throttling on their network by the end of 2012.

=== Injection of content ===
Rogers injects a warning message into Google.com

Since early December, 2007, Rogers has been injecting their own content into other companies' websites without permission. Rogers users who are close to their maximum data cap in their internet plan of choice are seeing red text appear above the content of every website they visit. The notice continues to appear on every page until the user either clicks a link acknowledging that they have seen the message or chooses to opt out of the notification.
