= Bell Internet =

Internet service provided by Bell Canada

- Type: Subsidiary
- Industry: Internet service provider
- Founded: November 29, 1995; 30 years ago
- Headquarters: Montreal, Quebec, Canada
- Products: xDSL; FTTH; Dial-up
- Parent: BCE Inc.
- Website: bell.ca/internet

Bell Internet, originally called Sympatico, is a Canadian residential internet service provider. It is a division of BCE. As of May 3, 2012, Bell Internet had over 3 million subscribers in Ontario and Quebec, making it the largest ISP in Canada.

== History ==
=== 1990s: Early years ===
Bell Internet's former logo as Bell Sympatico

Sympatico was launched on November 29, 1995. Originally a national service operated jointly by Canada's incumbent local exchange carriers and operational run as a content portal by MediaLinx, the companies other than Bell (including Aliant) have since retreated to their own brands.

=== 2000s: Value-added services and rebranding ===
Starting in Summer 2003, Sympatico tried to differentiate its service from its competitors by adding value-added services. This meant the launch of Radial Point's (formerly Zero Knowledge) suite of antivirus, firewall and anti-spyware services. Although a fee was originally required, this is no longer the case, as Bell now provides the service at no extra charge for DSL customers. In 2004, Sympatico added a Wireless modem-router hardware upgrade and Microsoft's MSN Premium software to its portfolio. In Summer 2007, Sympatico packaged its Security suite and Wireless home networking modem together with its high speed offering as Sympatico Total Internet.

Bell Sympatico changed its name to Bell Internet on August 8, 2008, in conjunction with the Today Just Got Better rebranding. Bell subsidiaries NorthernTel, Télébec and Northwestel continue to brand their Internet services as Sympatico, and users receive an @ntl.sympatico.ca, @tlb.sympatico.ca, or @sympatico.ca email address, respectively.

=== 2010s: Lower caps and faster speeds ===
On January 3, 2012, customer advocacy blog Stop The Cap! reported that Bell lowered its bandwidth caps in Ontario and Quebec by 10 GB for all new activations of its Fibe services, except for the Fibe 25 plan in Ontario which was lowered by 25 GB instead and Fibe 6 and 7 which remain unchanged. In May 2012, Bell launched new fibre-to-the-home (FTTH) plans and simplified its slower DSL plans. FTTH regions can now download and upload at symmetric speeds of up to 175 Mbit/s. The previous changes for lower bandwidth caps were reverted for the new Fibe 15/1 and Fibe 25/7 plans. The Fibe 5/1 plan replaced the older Essential, Essential Plus, Fibe 6 and Fibe 7 plans. The bandwidth cap for Fibe 5/1, however, was lowered from 25 GB to 15 GB.

The Fibe 50/50 FTTH plan was removed from Bell's website by February 2013. In its place, a Fibe 50/10 FTTN plan was made available for the first time. During that same month, usage caps for the 15/10, 25/10 and 50/10 plans were lowered by 15, 25 and 75 GB respectively. February also saw the addition of an unlimited Internet usage add-on for Bell Internet. It costs $30/month and can be added to any residential plan. Those who subscribe to telephony (Bell Mobility or Bell Home Phone) and residential television (Bell Satellite TV or Bell Fibe TV) from Bell can obtain a $20/month discount on the unlimited Internet usage add-on.

== Hardware ==
When Bell started its DSL Internet service, then known as Sympatico, it simply offered one DSL modem, the Nortel 1-Meg Modem, which connected to only one computer. Later, it added more models with routing and wireless LAN capabilities built-in, eliminating the need to purchase additional hardware. Customers previously had to pay extra for such capabilities. Today, both of these features are standard in both all-in-one devices Bell lends to its customers. Standard DSL customers must rent Bell's 2Wire 2701HG-G device, which can create 802.11g wireless access point. VDSL customers consist of any service with more than 1 Mbit/s of upload speed, and they must rent the Cellpipe router 802.11n-capable device instead, which also bundles a superior DSL modem.

Bell Internet DSL modems
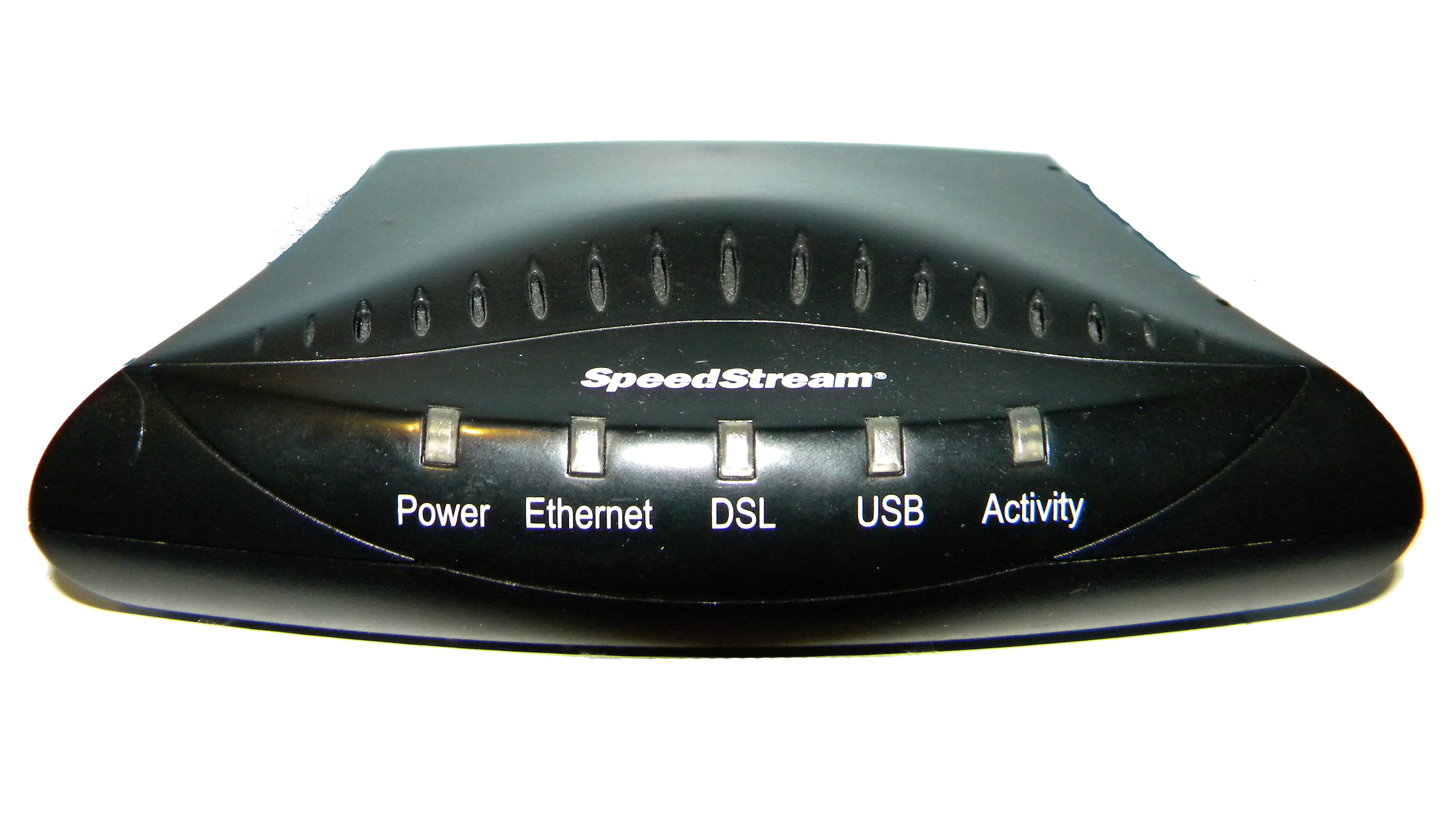
1 – SpeedStream 5200

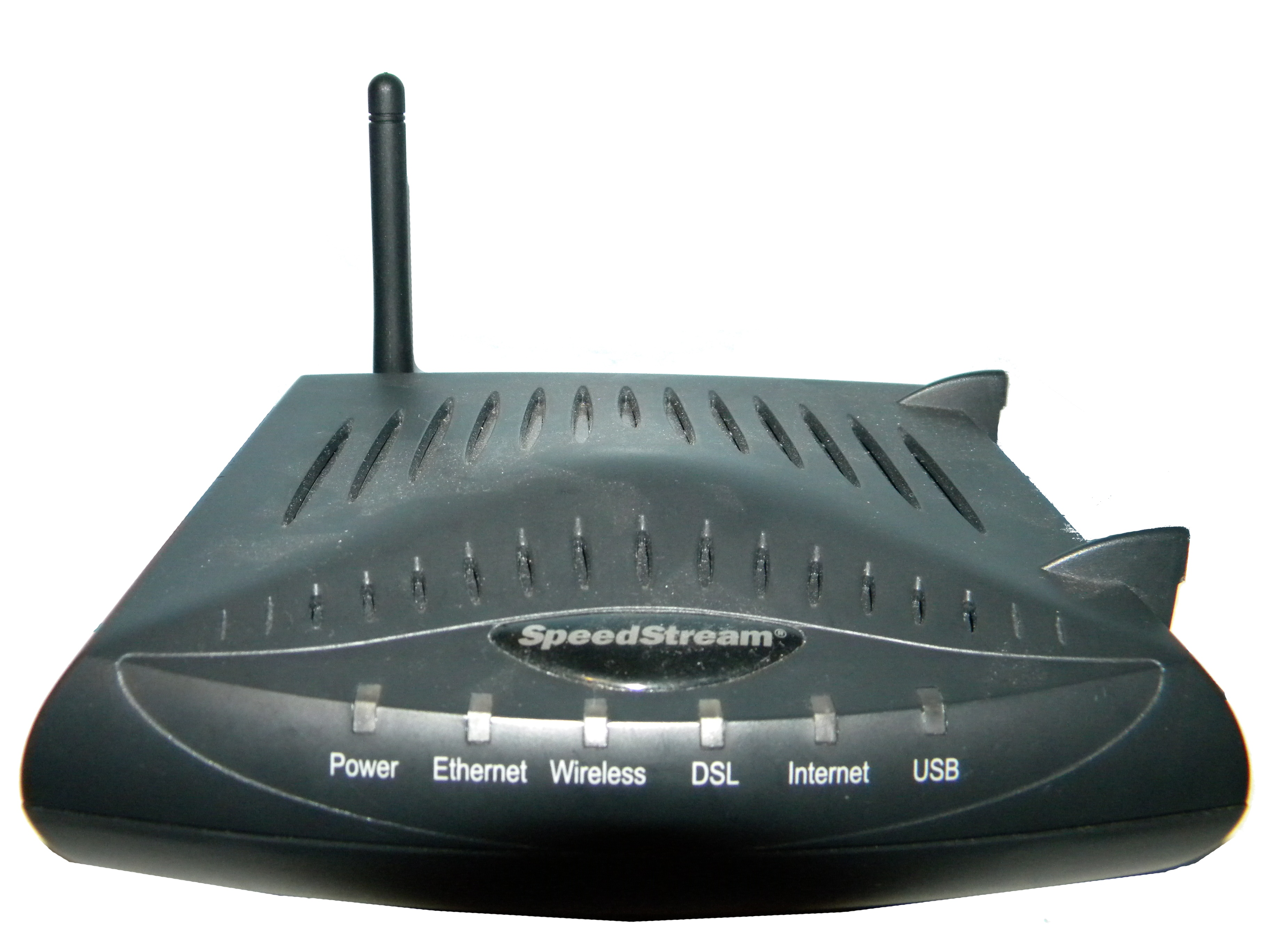
2 – SpeedStream 6520 front view

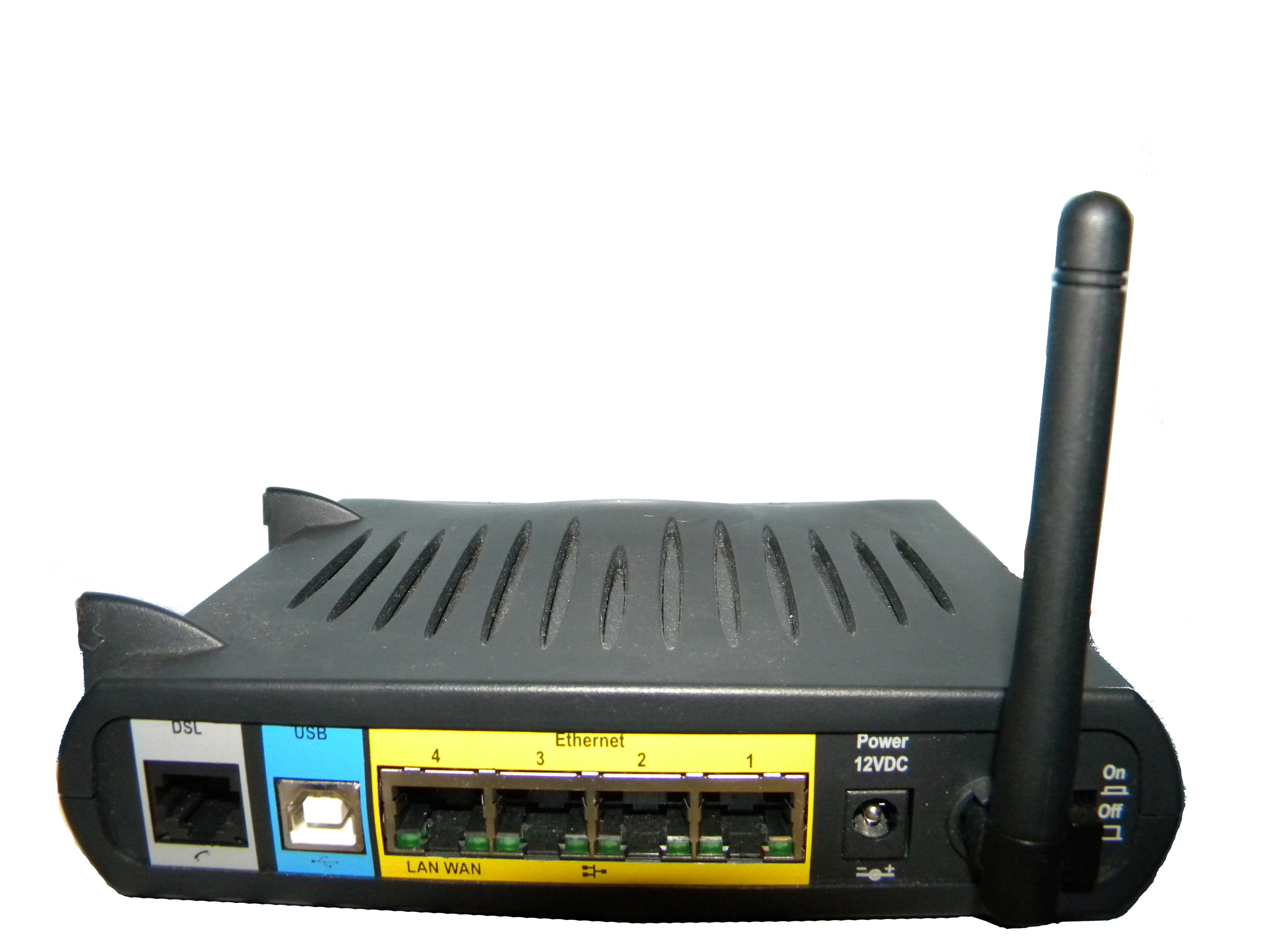
3 – SpeedStream 6520 rear view

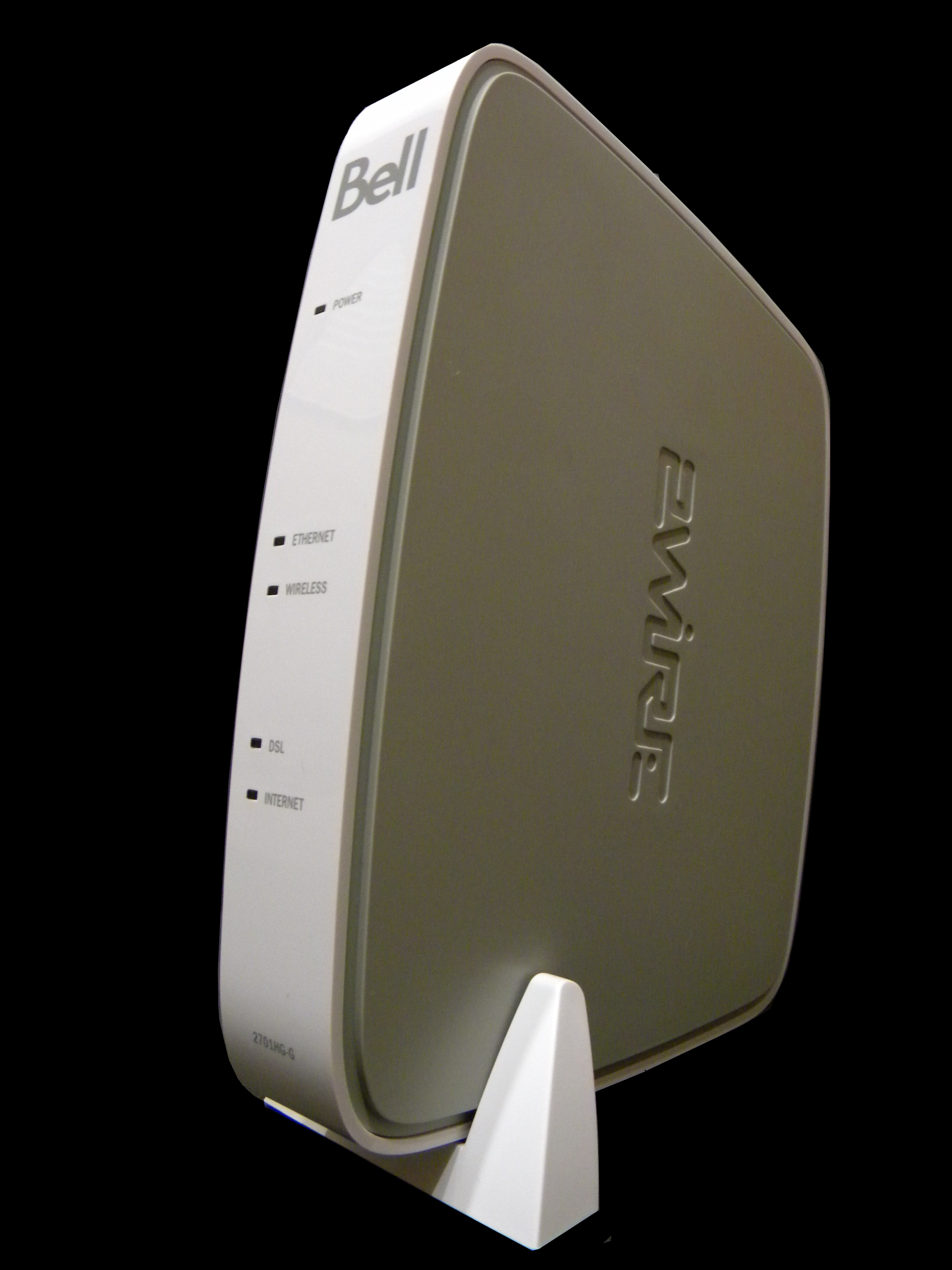
4 – 2Wire 2701

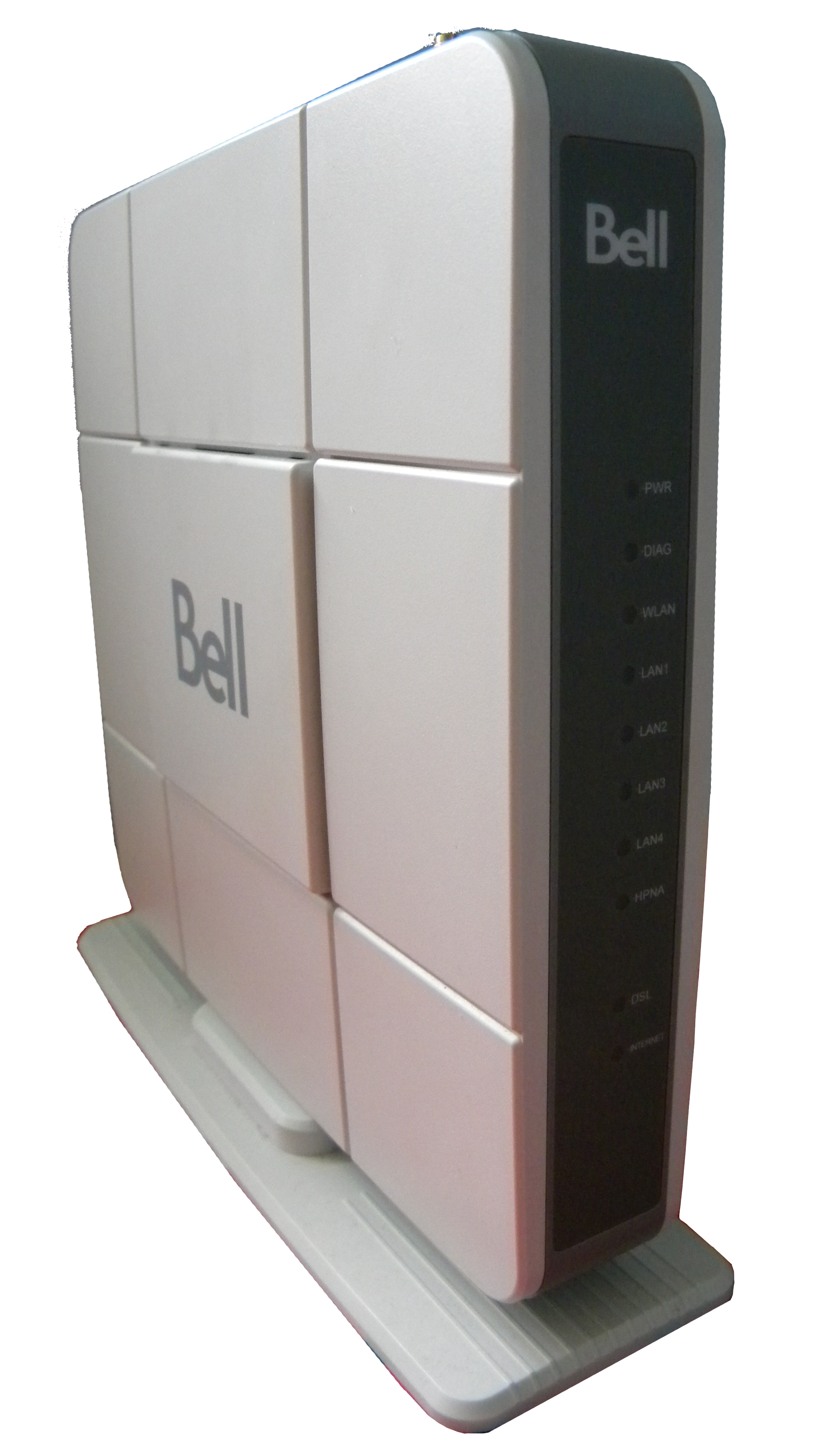
5 - Cellpipe 7130
1. The SpeedStream 5200 is a basic, legacy device, distributed during the early 2000s, providing an RJ45 or a USB port for connectivity.
2. The SpeedStream 6520 is a wireless-capable, legacy device, distributed during the mid-2000s,
3. The back of the SpeedStream 6520. Four RJ45 ports, one USB port and 802.11g wireless LAN antenna for connectivity can be seen.
4. The 2Wire 2701HG-G is Bell's current device for standard DSL customers, distributed since 2009. It provides four RJ45 ports and 802.11g wireless LAN for connectivity, but omits the previously available USB port.
5. The Cellpipe 7130 has the same ports as the 2Wire, but also adds ports for a wireless antenna, a console or fibre. (No longer being distributed)
6. The Sagemcom F@st 2864 (marketed as the ″Bell Connection Hub″) was used for ADSL/VDSL and FTTH customers, distributed 2010 to June 2014. It provides one WAN port for FTTH, an RJ11 jack for VDSL connection, four GigE LAN ports, an HPNA connector, 802.11b/g/n wireless LAN for connectivity and 2 USB ports.
7. The Sagemcom F@st 4350 (Marketed as the "Home Hub 1000") is Bell's current device, since June 2014, for internet only customers subscribing to 15/10 or higher and issued on both ADSL/VDSL and FTTH. It provides one WAN port for FTTH, an RJ11 jack for VDSL connection, four GigE LAN ports, 802.11b/g/n (2.4 GHz) wireless LAN for connectivity and 2 USB ports.
8. The Sagemcom F@st 5250 (Marketed as the "Home Hub 2000") is Bell's current device, since June 2014, for internet and Fibe TV customers issued on both ADSL/VDSL and FTTH. It provides one WAN port for FTTH, two grey RJ11 jack for VDSL connection (pair bonding capable), two green RJ11 jacks for VoIP (not currently used), four GigE LAN ports, 802.11b/g/n (2.4 GHz) and 802.11a/n/ac (5 GHz) wireless LAN for connectivity and 2 USB ports. Homehub 3000 was the primary modem from all new bell services starting in 2014. It included an sfp-ont pprt for gigabit fibre Internet, dual DSL connections for pair bonded ADSL where available.

In November 2021, the Home Hub 4000 is Bell's newest modem, for Internet and Fibe TV customers on different types of Plans.

Homehub 4000 was upgraded to gigahib models in 2022, offering expanded wifi6 capabilities along with other key improvements. The gigahub 2.0 released in 2025 is the latest generation of fibre optic only, multi gigabit modem including advanced wifi7 capabilities.

== Service offerings ==
While Bell Internet mostly sells digital subscriber line (DSL) service, they also offer dial-up service to businesses and grandfathered residential customers. This legacy technology uses a telephone modem to provide Internet access.

=== Digital Subscriber Line (DSL) ===
Bell's digital subscriber line (DSL) services are based on ADSL, ADSL2+ and VDSL2 technology. The main differences in both equipments vary from the speed of signal, its length and its ability to overcome the noise of a phone line. Except for very few grandfathered customers, Bell has monthly data transfer limits for all of their tiered Internet services. Both downloads and uploads count towards the limit. The following Bell Internet services are only available in Ontario and Quebec, and availability varies by region. Fibe services can only be used where fibre-to-the-neighbourhood (FTTN) technology is deployed. This currently includes urban Hamilton, Montreal, Ottawa and Toronto as well as most major cities around GTA. Non-FTTN regions offer two plans: Bell Internet and Bell Internet Plus.

Bell has simplified its DSL lineup to offer only two traditional plans and five FTTN plans.

==== Dry DSL ====
Naked DSL, commonly known as dry DSL in Canada, consists of a DSL service without a traditional home phone service. Bell does not charge any additional fees for dry DSL service; previously, there was a charge of $4 per month. Bell charges resellers a monthly fee ranging from $7.25 to $25.10 and a one-time activation fee for dry DSL service. Although Bell still attributes a phone number to a dry DSL line, it cannot be used for phone calls. When one attempts to call a dry DSL phone number, they receive the following message: "The number you are calling cannot receive incoming calls. This is a recording." The message is then repeated in French.

=== Fibre To The X (FTTX) ===
Bell Fibe Internet (FTTH) services are offered by Bell in select regions of Ontario and Quebec. Bell guarantees that the FTTH download and upload speeds advertised will be delivered to the Bell equipment. Bell Fibe Internet is offered at the following speeds: 25/25 Mbit/s, 50/50 Mbit/s, 150/150 Mbit/s, 500/500 Mbit/s, 1.5/0.94 Gbit/s, 3/3 Gbit/s, and 8/8 Gbit/s.

Bell Aliant offers a similar but different Fibe service under the same branding to certain areas in Atlantic Canada.

=== Internet security ===
Since April 11, 2013, Bell offers McAfee Security on all of its current Internet plans.

=== Add-ons ===
These are services offered by Bell Internet in addition to DSL or FTTH services, either for free or at additional costs:

- PC Care, an optional computer technical support service with a monthly fee.
- Usage Insurance, which increases the monthly bandwidth cap with one or multiple blocks of 25 GB, or provides unlimited Internet usage for a fee.
- Unlimited Internet Usage
- Wireless Home Networking

=== Legacy services ===
Bell previously offered Portable Internet and Rural Internet services in select rural regions, similarly to what Rogers Communications offered. These services used the Inukshuk Wireless network. Bell has discontinued these offerings. Customers are encouraged to use Bell Mobility Internet services instead, which generally offer a much lower bandwidth cap.

Bell Entertainment was a bundle offer which included Bell Fibe TV service and 25 Mbit/s "Fibe" DSL. It was only available in some parts of the GTA (Greater Toronto Area). Customers can now add any DSL Internet plan to their Fibe TV service. Despite being an IPTV service, Bell does not charge usage-based billing for Bell Fibe TV.

Personal Vault was a backup service, available nationwide both for customers and non-customers.

While inMusic remains available as a music news portal, both the digital music store and subscription service were discontinued.

== See also ==
- Bell Canada
- Cogeco
- Net Neutrality
- Rogers Internet
- TekSavvy
- List of internet service providers in Canada
