= MSN Dial-Up Internet Access =

Internet service provider operated by Microsoft

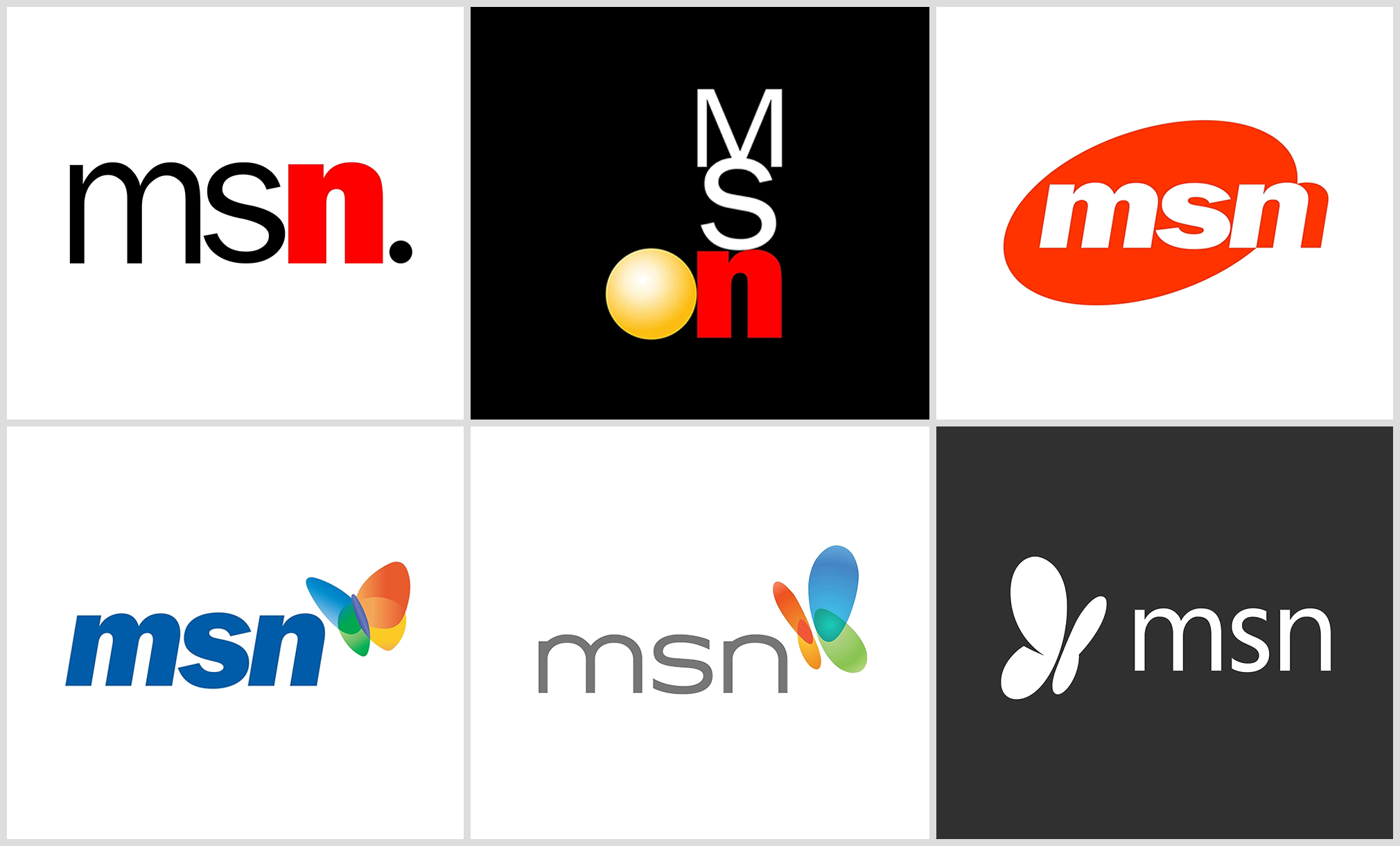
- The MSN logo changed several times as the service evolved throughout its history (top row from left: 1995, 1996, 1998; and bottom row from left: 2000, 2009, 2014)
- Type: Division of Microsoft
- Industry: Internet
- Founded: August 24, 1995; 31 years ago
- Area served: United States (MSN Dial-Up); Worldwide (MSN Premium)
- Products: Dial-up Internet access
- Owner: Microsoft
- Website: membercenter.msn.com www.microsoft.com

MSN Dial-Up Internet Access is an Internet service provider operated by Microsoft in the United States and formerly also in several other countries. Originally named The Microsoft Network, it debuted as a proprietary online service on August 24, 1995, to coincide with the release of Windows 95. In 1996 and 1997, a revised web-based version of the ISP was an early experiment at interactive multimedia content on the Internet.

Microsoft renamed the service MSN Internet Access in 1998, focusing its main "MSN" brand on its web portal of the same name, MSN.com. As of 2025, the company still provides dial-up Internet access under the name "MSN Dial-Up Internet Access" for those who cannot access high-speed broadband. For several years, MSN was the second largest dial-up ISP in the United States behind longtime leader AOL, but very few people in the U.S. still rely on dial-up.

Along with dial-up service, MSN provides its subscribers with its MSN Explorer software and an @msn.com email account to use with Outlook.com. Microsoft also still offers that software as part of a standalone subscription service for users with broadband Internet access worldwide named MSN Premium, but as of 2025, it is outdated by modern standards and no longer offers any other features exclusive to members.

== Early history ==
=== The Microsoft Network ===
'Sign In' screen in MSN Classic

'MSN Central' screen in MSN Classic

The concept for MSN was created by the Advanced Technology Group at Microsoft, headed by Nathan Myhrvold. MSN was originally conceived as a subscription-based dial-up online service and proprietary content provider like America Online or CompuServe. Then officially known as The Microsoft Network, version 1.0 of the service launched to the public (after an initial beta test period) along with Windows 95 on August 24, 1995.

The Microsoft Network was originally presented through a Windows desktop icon and sign-in screen that, upon dial-up connection and member authentication, launched an artificial folder-like graphical user interface integrated into the Windows Explorer file management program, with a home page named "MSN Central". Categories on MSN appeared like folders in the file system. The interface was designed by Clement Mok and employed high color graphics.

MSN was included with Windows 95 installations and promoted through Windows and other Microsoft software released at the time. Product support and discussion was offered through the MSN service, as well as information such as news and weather, basic email capabilities, chat rooms, and message boards similar to newsgroups. It also offered access to the Internet and the World Wide Web via Internet Explorer.

There was debate in the media as to whether MSN might be an "Internet killer" or "web killer", and some companies hedged their bets for the first year, creating content both on MSN and the web. However, MSN launched too late to be a real threat to the web. Following Bill Gates' internal "Internet Tidal Wave" memo, which refocused Microsoft to be Internet-centric, MSN began to move its content to the web and promote itself more actively as an Internet service provider.

Following the release of the web-based MSN 2.0 in 1996, Microsoft renamed its original proprietary online service "MSN Classic". Microsoft eventually shut down any remaining access to the MSN Classic service in 1998.

=== MSN 2.0 ===
The MSN Preview, a mock premiere event with host Michael Shapiro

Feature demo in the MSN Preview

MSN Program Viewer in MSN 2.0

In 1996, in response to the increasing relevancy and rapid growth of the World Wide Web, Microsoft created a new version of MSN, called "MSN 2.0", which combined access to the Internet with web-based multimedia content in a new web browser known as the MSN Program Viewer. The service was promoted to existing MSN subscribers beginning October 10, 1996; the general release followed on December 10, 1996.

Microsoft promoted MSN 2.0 with a series of advertisements and promotional materials describing the service with the phrase, "Every new universe begins with a big bang." The company offered the initial release of the new MSN 2.0 service on a CD-ROM that it sent to MSN subscribers in the fall of 1996. When inserted, the CD-ROM opened to the ambitious and flashy MSN Preview, an interactive video-based experience that introduced current and prospective subscribers to the new version of MSN and described the features of the MSN 2.0 software.

The MSN Preview was filmed at the Paramount Theatre in Seattle and was formatted as a guided tour of a mock Hollywood-style premiere event for the new MSN. It was hosted by a witty and sarcastic character named "Michael", played by actor Michael Shapiro, who welcomed viewers outside of the theater and then guided them through the theater to meet several other characters, each of whom represented one of the six numbered television-like channels of MSN 2.0's "On Stage" area, the main platform for interactive multimedia content in MSN 2.0.

A handful of uncredited actors appeared in the MSN Preview, including then-unknown actress Anna Faris, who represented "Channel 5", which the software described as "media, zines, attitude"; it was a "hip and edgy" content hub targeted at the young adults of Generation X and college-age members. The preview also included its own jazz and pop music loop that played during the installation process.

Once installed, members accessed MSN content through the MSN Program Viewer, which was essentially an animated, stylized and streamlined Internet Explorer shell interface on top of an Internet Explorer 3.0 web browser. When members signed in, they would be presented with the several different "Channels", which were categories for the various types of content available on MSN.

These channels included new services that launched in 1996 such as msnbc.com, a news website now known as NBCNews.com that began as a partnership between Microsoft and NBC; and Slate, an online magazine focused on politics and current events. Both websites were available to all Internet users, and they have continued to exist decades later, although they are no longer owned by Microsoft. Also integrated into MSN 2.0 shortly after its launch was Microsoft's popular Internet Gaming Zone, which later became MSN Games.

Interactive multimedia content was presented in a TV-like format, dubbed MSN shows, as part of the "On Stage" section. The many shows and sites included an interactive online nightly game show called "Netwits", a snarky website addressing women's issues called "UnderWire", and a regular celebrity interview and web-surfing session called "One Click Away".

These new destinations supplemented other Microsoft web-based services such as CarPoint and Expedia, which were branded within MSN as "Essentials". An additional "Communicate" section was based around email, chat rooms (which were branded MSN Chat and moved to the standard IRC protocol), and newsgroups (which were moved to Usenet from a proprietary architecture), while a "Find" section was dedicated to searching MSN content and the rest of the Internet; it also provided a calendar of upcoming events and new shows on MSN.

The new content made extensive use of multimedia and interactive features, including VBScript and early implementations of Macromedia Shockwave Flash (originally called "FutureSplash") for animations.

While the MSN shows approach was unique and innovative, the content was not easily accessible by members with low-end computers and slower dial-up connections. High-speed Internet access was not widely available at the time, and some users subscribed to monthly dial-up plans that limited the number of hours during which they were allowed to access the service. The MSN 2.0 software was also unstable and would often quit unexpectedly.

In addition to MSN 2.0's speed and stability issues, existing MSN subscribers were concerned the transition to MSN 2.0 would break up communities that were established via the MSN Classic message boards and chat rooms. Their concerns were confirmed when Microsoft announced plans to close the entire MSN Classic service. As a result of all these issues, a website called "The Official msNOT Hate Site" originated as a negative response to the new MSN 2.0 software. The website claimed Microsoft patently ignored feedback from concerned members and censored anyone who spoke out against the upgrade; it further charged the company's handling of the transition to MSN 2.0 was "insensitive and ethically questionable." Microsoft denied it attempted to silence those who expressed concern about the upgrade. The website also mocked the music loop that played during the MSN 2.0 installation process because it repeated the phrase "too stupid to stop."

Ultimately, the ambitious use of web-based and interactive multimedia content on the Internet during 1996 and 1997 proved to be ahead of its time, and the MSN 2.0 service was not as successful as Microsoft initially hoped. The company returned to the drawing board for its next MSN release.

=== MSN 2.5 ===
In 1997, after abandoning the interactive multimedia format, the MSN service was again refocused, this time as a more traditional Internet access service. With the release of MSN 2.5 (which was code named "Metro" and sometimes referred to in marketing materials as "MSN Premier") in late 1997, some exclusive MSN branded content was still offered through the MSN Program Viewer, but the service primarily directed members to traditional text-based websites that anyone on the Internet could access, instead of interactive shows.

Beginning with MSN 2.5, email service for MSN members was moved from a proprietary Microsoft Exchange environment that powered email for both MSN Classic and MSN 2.0, to standard POP3 and SMTP protocols that could be accessed via any Internet email program, including Microsoft's own Internet Mail and News, which became Outlook Express with the introduction of Internet Explorer 4.0. MSN also launched "Friends Online", a predecessor to the MSN Messenger Service that allowed members to add each other as friends, see each other's online presence and send instant messages to one another.

Accompanying the MSN Program Viewer in MSN 2.5 was "MSN Quick Launch", an icon inside the Windows notification area. Like the MSN Program Viewer in MSN 2.0, the menu in MSN Quick Launch could be dynamically updated to guide members to updated MSN content and services.

=== MSN 2.6 and 5.0 ===
With the release of MSN 2.6 in 1998, Microsoft renamed the service MSN Internet Access, and the MSN Program Viewer was abandoned entirely in favor of the more familiar Internet Explorer. Another new version of the service, MSN Internet Access 5.0, was released along with Internet Explorer 5.0 in 1999. MSN 5.0 was largely identical to MSN 2.6, aside from offering the newer version of the browser.

Also in 1998, Microsoft relaunched its Microsoft Internet Start web portal as MSN.com and began to focus on offering services under the "MSN" brand name to users of other Internet service providers. Building on the success of MSN's web-based email service, Hotmail (which was acquired by Microsoft in December 1997), the MSN Messenger Service for instant messaging was launched in 1999. Unlike the "Friends Online" service bundled with MSN 2.5 that required an MSN membership, anyone with a free Microsoft Passport or Hotmail account could use MSN Messenger.

== MSN Explorer ==
MSN Explorer

- MSN Explorer 11.65 on Windows 10
- Developer: Microsoft
- Stable release: 11.80.0015.0100 / March 15, 2021
- Operating system: Windows 7, Windows 8, Windows 8.1, Windows 10, Windows 11
- Platform: Microsoft Windows
- Website: membercenter.msn.com

With the release of Windows XP in 2001 (which also brought with it Internet Explorer 6), Microsoft began to offer content for MSN Internet Access subscribers through a program called MSN Explorer. This program is similar to the early MSN Program Viewer in that it provides access to MSN websites, email, instant messaging, and other content on top of a web browser (an Internet Explorer shell) based on the Trident layout engine. MSN Explorer is similar to AOL Desktop, which also has a built-in email client and provides access to content for AOL members.

Upon the transition to MSN Explorer, email for MSN members was integrated into Microsoft's Hotmail architecture and could be accessed from the web the same way as any other Hotmail account. MSN Explorer provided a user interface for navigating one's @msn.com email inbox and folders, also known as "MSN Mail", until the migration of Hotmail to the Windows Live brand. MSN subscribers were upgraded to the standard version of Hotmail in 2008, but with additional storage capacity compared to free Hotmail users. Microsoft phased out Hotmail and replaced it with Outlook.com in 2013, but MSN subscribers still receive @msn.com email addresses to use with the service ad-free. Former members can continue to use those addresses with Outlook.com after ending their subscriptions.

=== Version history ===
==== MSN 6 and 7 ====
An early pre-release version of MSN Explorer, labeled version 1.1, was originally included with a development build of Windows XP. The public release, MSN Explorer version 6.0 (officially numbered to follow the last release of the older MSN 5.0 software), was built into Windows XP with its release in October 2001. Anyone who used Windows XP could choose to use MSN Explorer to browse the web and access MSN-branded services regardless of their MSN membership status. The user interface for MSN Explorer matched the visual style of Windows XP and utilized relatively responsive animations that would not become commonplace in web browsers until HTML5 came along several years later.

Microsoft began referring to the MSN Explorer software as simply "MSN" beginning with version 7, an update that was rolled out shortly after the initial release of Windows XP. Microsoft halted development of the free edition of the software in 2002 in favor of a version only available with MSN Dial-Up and Premium subscriptions. Versions of MSN Explorer later than 7.5 require a paid subscription, but it is possible to use another Internet service provider while accessing content provided through the MSN Explorer software. The last free version of the MSN software also remained available for download for some time.

==== MSN 8 and 9 ====
MSN versions 8 and 9 were released in 2002 and 2004 respectively. As of MSN version 9, the software began requiring a user to have a Microsoft account, though depending on the version, it may or may not require an active subscription to other MSN services. The interface also includes many Flash animations. Version 9.5 added compatibility with Windows Vista. Version 9.6 was released in June 2008 and included revisions necessary for a newer mailbox synchronization technology and to replace the MSN Parental Controls menu options with links to the newer Windows Live Family Safety feature.

==== MSN 10 ====
Microsoft began rolling out MSN version 10 in November 2009, following the release of Windows 7. Features included full compatibility with Internet Explorer 8, an integrated spell checker, and the ability to exclude MSN Messenger from the installation. Version 10.2 was released in 2011, including photo email integration with SkyDrive (now OneDrive), the ability to include photos or a photo slideshow with a link so others can download a copy for themselves, and customizable toolbar button groups. Version 10.5 added minor improvements to the MSN software; most notably Microsoft changed its user agent to disguise it as a newer web browser in order to bypass "outdated browser" warning messages from some websites.

==== MSN 11 ====
MSN Explorer 11 is the current version, which was released in April 2014 and offers compatibility with Windows 8 and Internet Explorer 11, adds tabbed browsing, and brings back a "remember me" feature. At the time, the software still included an instant messaging client based on Microsoft's Messenger service, even though it had been phased out in favor of Skype since 2013. Subsequent releases of MSN 11 included updated email functionality to maintain compatibility with Outlook.com in version 11.5, updated logos to match MSN's 2014 website redesign branding in 11.6, and recovery of previously open web pages after a crash in 11.7. As of 2025, the latest version of MSN Explorer is 11.8, with no further updates to the software since 2021, stagnating at a time when other mainstream web browsers including Microsoft's own Edge have since moved to a rapid release model to better handle modern web apps.

=== MSN for Mac OS X ===
MSN for Mac OS X was a dial-up client interface to Microsoft's pay-for-access online services for Mac users available from 2002 to 2005. The software was, in some respects, comparable to the AOL dial-up client given its channel-based interface, built-in chat and instant messaging capabilities, parental controls, and ability to accommodate multiple screen names. It used the Tasman layout engine made for the Mac edition of Internet Explorer 5. The software was discontinued in March 2005. After the discontinuation of MSN for Mac OS X, Microsoft continued offering its Microsoft Messenger for Mac software, an instant messaging-only client that required only a free Microsoft account for use, until it was replaced by Skype in 2013.

== International ==
Microsoft extended its MSN Dial-Up Internet Access service to several other countries beyond the United States since 1995, partnering with various telecommunications companies to provide service in numerous areas around the world.

In Canada, MSN partnered with Bell Sympatico (the ISP division of Bell Canada) creating "Sympatico / MSN". In Australia, Microsoft originally partnered with Telstra in 1995 with MSN branded locally as "OnAustralia"; when Microsoft withdrew from the joint venture the following year, Telstra went on to assume 100% ownership and rebrand the service as BigPond. In Mexico, MSN partnered with Telmex Prodigy creating "Prodigy / MSN". An affiliation with Xtra, Telecom New Zealand's Internet provider, known as XtraMSN ended in 2006.

MSN maintained many offices worldwide for national customer support. It utilized the service of call centers around the world. Among the countries were the Philippines (technical and customer service), El Salvador (technical and customer support for Spanish-speaking customers), and India (customer service). In 2007, Microsoft set up a research and development center for MSN China, based in Shanghai's Zizhu Science Park, which hosted technical support for MSN services.

== MSN Premium ==
For customers with high-speed broadband Internet access, MSN Premium is a subscription service provided by Microsoft that combines Internet services into a premium version of MSN Explorer. It also once offered firewall and anti-virus software provided by McAfee and Spy Sweeper. In order to use MSN Premium, users subscribe to the service through the Microsoft Store. Alternatively, MSN Premium can be purchased directly from the Microsoft Store and, as of 2025, costs $99 for a year in the U.S., also costing €99 in European countries like Germany and France.

In the past, MSN Premium could be obtained by American customers by acquiring DSL through one of MSN's partners, such as Verizon or Qwest (now merged with CenturyLink) in the United States or Bell Internet in Canada. Microsoft also offered premium services with Verizon through the Windows Live brand name beginning in 2006. MSN Premium provided through Verizon was disbanded on March 1, 2012, and users could no longer use MSN Premium with Verizon after that date.

The value of MSN Premium as a paid subscription service for people who have already separately subscribed to broadband Internet access has long been questioned, with a CNET article in 2008 criticizing the service for offering very few features that aren't already available for free elsewhere, as well as a popular YouTube video in 2021 expressing surprise that Microsoft still offers the paid service, that its MSN Explorer software has not been meaningfully updated since the era of Windows XP in the 2000s, and that most of its "premium" features are simply links to freely-accessible public websites.

== See also ==
- MSN
- List of services by MSN
- Microsoft
- Microsoft Windows
- Windows 95
- Internet Explorer
