= Boeing Calc =

- Developer: Boeing Computer Services Co.
- Initial release: April 1985; 40 years ago
- Stable release: 4.0 / November 1987; 38 years ago
- Operating system: DOS, IBM MVS
- Type: Spreadsheet
- License: Proprietary

Boeing Calc was a spreadsheet package written by Boeing Computer Services, an independent subsidiary of aviation manufacturer Boeing. It had originally been developed as an in-house accounting tool, but was launched as a commercial product in April 1985 for IBM 4300 mainframes running IBM MVS and IBM PC microcomputers running DOS. The original launch price was $399 per copy for the PC version and $8,899 for a combined PC/mainframe bundle.

Boeing Calc could read and later write standard Lotus 1-2-3 files. It supported a maximum spreadsheet size of 16,000 columns by 16,000 rows, and was notable for introducing the concept of 3D spreadsheets. Each spreadsheet could have up to 16,000 pages, with cells prefixed by the page number; the upper-left cell of the third page was referred to as 3A1, for example. This concept was a precursor of the tabbed sheets included in Quattro Pro and later spreadsheets.

Version 3.0 was launched in August 1987 and introduced multi-user support on PC-based local area networks, with a price of $795 for a LAN licence. Version 4.0 followed in November of that year, with the price for a single-user licence reduced to $395. Unlike competitors such as Lotus 1-2-3 and Quattro it did not support graphics, although Boeing sold a companion program - Boeing Graph - that could produce 3D charts. Contemporary reviews of version 3.0 praised Boeing Calc's flexibility and ability to work with files of up to 32mb in size, but criticised its steep system requirements, slow speed, and reliance on disk-based virtual memory. Running on a high-end 6 MHz IBM PC AT with an Intel 8087 maths coprocessor, Infoworld's standard spreadsheet took 42.9 seconds to recalculate, versus 7.9 for the same sheet running in Lotus 1-2-3.

Towards the end of 1987 Boeing announced its intention to leave the microcomputer software industry. Boeing Computer Services was sold off as an independent entity, Garrison Software Corp, to West German software distributors m+s Elektronik. However the deal fell through and BCS reverted to Boeing's control, where it was eventually merged with Boeing Information Services. Boeing Calc ceased development in 1988, with the final copies being sold off to employees at a discount price of $50.
