= Quattro Pro =

Spreadsheet software

- Original author: Borland
- Developer: Alludo
- Initial release: 1988; 38 years ago
- Stable release: 2021 U1 / July 28, 2022; 3 years ago
- Operating system: Microsoft Windows
- Type: Spreadsheet
- License: Proprietary
- Website: www.wordperfect.com

Quattro Pro is a spreadsheet program developed by Borland and now sold by Alludo, most often as part of Alludo's WordPerfect Office suite.

== Characteristics ==
Historically, Quattro Pro used keyboard commands close to those of Lotus 1-2-3. While it is commonly said to have been the first program to use tabbed sheets, Boeing Calc actually utilized tabbed sheets earlier. It currently runs under the Windows operating system. For years Quattro Pro had a competitive advantage, in regard to maximum row and column limits (allowing a maximum worksheet size of one million rows by 18,276 columns). This avoided the 65,536 row by 256 column spreadsheet limitations inherent to Microsoft Excel (prior to Excel 2007). Even with the maximum row advantage, Quattro Pro has been a distant second to Excel, in terms of sales numbers, since approximately 1996 to the present.

When version 1.0 was in development, it was codenamed "Buddha" since it was meant to "assume the Lotus position", #1 in the market. When the product was launched in 1988, its original name, suggested to Mr. Kahn by Senior VP, Spencer Leyton at a Vietnamese restaurant in Santa Cruz, was Quattro (the Italian word for "four", a play on being one step ahead of "1-2-3"). Borland changed the name to Quattro Pro for its 1990 release.

The common file extension of Quattro Pro spreadsheet file is .qpw, which it has used since version 9. Quattro Pro versions 7 and 8 used .wb3, version 6 used .wb2, version 5 used .wb1, and DOS versions used .wq2 and .wq1.

== Origins ==
The original Borland Quattro electronic spreadsheet was a DOS program, the initial development of which was done by three Eastern Europeans, one of whom, the Hungarian Lajos Frank, was later hired by Microsoft. An article appeared in PC Week in 1985, quoting a maker of spreadsheet templates saying that he was in close contact with Borland, and that Borland was developing a spreadsheet. At the time, there was absolutely no such development being undertaken by Borland. After they both read the article, Philippe Kahn and Spencer Leyton had a casual conversation where they joked, half seriously, about perhaps developing a spreadsheet to compete with Lotus Development's 1-2-3. That led to Mr. Kahn setting an appointment with an agent for some Eastern European software developers, Robert Stein of Andromeda Software, which was also involved with the game Tetris. That led to an agreement negotiated by Mr. Leyton and Mr. Stein, providing for the development of the original Quattro.

Quattro was written in assembly language and Turbo C, principally by Adam Bosworth, Lajos Frank, and Chuck Batterman. It was praised mainly for superior graphics on DOS. Borland acquired a replacement product called "Surpass", written in Modula-2. The main designers and programmers of Surpass were also hired by Borland to turn Surpass into Quattro Pro: Bob Warfield, Dave Anderson, Weikuo Liaw, Bob Richardson and Tod Landis. They joined other Borland programmers including Chuck Batterman, Lajos Frank, Tanj Bennett, Rich Reppert and Roger Schlafly. Bob Warfield later became Vice President of R&D at Borland. All eventually left Borland.

Quattro Pro shipped in the final quarter of 1989. The Borland main office was near the epicenter of the Loma Prieta earthquake and the building was severely damaged when large and heavy air conditioners on the roof of Borland's main building were thrown upward by the quake, and came crashing down upon the glulam beams running across the top of the building. The beams were damaged to the point where they required injections of epoxy in order to make them sturdy enough to support the building again. In addition, the sprinkler system was triggered. The building was closed for months. All the computers were removed, placed on the tennis courts, washed down (acoustic ceilings rained gray mush onto everything when the sprinklers ran) and dried with hair dryers. Those that booted up were put to work. Quattro Pro finished final quality assurance testing and was sent to manufacturing from those computers running on the tennis courts in the (fortunately) sunny and dry autumn weather.

== Lawsuit ==
Some have claimed that Quattro Pro was the first to use the tabbed notebook metaphor, but another spreadsheet, Boeing Calc, used tabs to multiple sheets, and allowed three-dimensional references before Quattro Pro was on the market. (Boeing Calc was so slow that its multiple sheet capabilities were barely usable.)

Quattro Pro was the subject of a major lawsuit by Lotus against Borland. Lotus argued that Quattro could not copy Lotus 1-2-3's menus. Borland supplied the 1-2-3 menus as an alternative because keystroke compatibility was needed in order to run macros in 1-2-3 worksheets. Borland argued that most cars operate the same, but they are not necessarily made the same. So, Lotus could not rationally "own" the way its program behaved. The district court ruled in favor of Lotus, but the appellate court ruled that the 1-2-3 menus were functional and not copyrightable. The case went all the way to the U.S. Supreme Court which split 4 to 4 (Justice Stevens recused himself). This left the lower court ruling intact, which was a victory for Borland. However, the broader issue of whether a company can own and protect the way its program behaves remained unresolved.

By the time the case was resolved, Borland no longer owned Quattro Pro. Borland sold the spreadsheet to Novell six months before the final decision was handed down.

== Quattro Pro for Windows ==
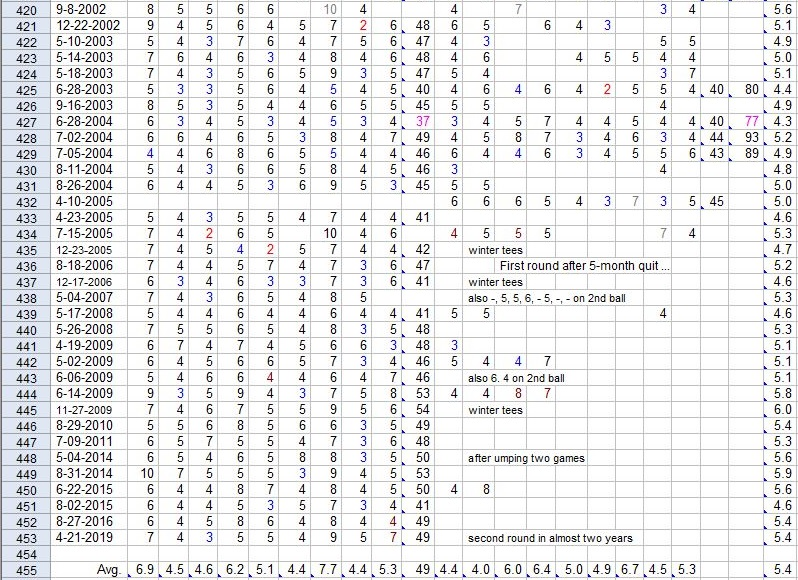
Portion of a Quattro Pro for Windows spreadsheet

Quattro Pro began as a DOS program (like Lotus 1-2-3) but with the growing popularity of Windows from Microsoft, a Windows version of Quattro needed to be written. There was almost nothing from the DOS code that could be moved to the Windows project, so the Quattro Pro for Windows (QPW) was written from scratch.

Both the QPW and Paradox for Windows codebases (the latter being another Borland database application) were based on Borland's internal pilot project with object oriented UI code for Windows. This project ran simultaneously with the Borland language group investigating the desirability of a C++ compiler, and the company decided to make a bet on C++. However, the C++ compiler was not ready at first, and OO code for both projects was started in C with OO emulation through macros. As the Borland Turbo C++ compiler became available internally the projects converted to using C++.

Charlie Anderson was put in charge of the project and he soon had Istvan Cseri, Weikuo Liaw, Murray Low, Steven Boye, Barry Spencer, Alan Bush, Dave Orton, Bernie Vachon, Anson Lee, Tod Landis, Gordon Ko and Chuck Batterman working on the project. Other engineers joined later. Eventually the team numbered nearly 20. The object model was inspired by the NeXT object model, modified by Mr. Cseri. Mr. Liaw and Mr. Spencer were in charge of the spreadsheet engine (written in assembly language) while Mr. Low wrote a large chunk of the UI.

The product was internally codenamed "Thor" for the Norse god of Thunder. QPW featured two major innovations. First, it was the first Windows spreadsheet with multiple pages with cells that could be linked together seamlessly, a feature from Quattro Pro which QPW extended. Second, it was the first released Windows program to have an attribute menu (or property pane) available by right-clicking on the object. Although this idea was first seen on the Xerox Alto, the idea had not been implemented on a major Windows program. Paradox for Windows shared this feature, and it was shown off by Phillipe Kahn at a Paradox user conference over a year before QPW was released. Both these ideas became widespread in the software industry.

QPW was one of the first big applications written in C++ on Windows, and it pushed the Borland C++ compiler to the limit. One reason why the Borland C++ Compiler was so good was that it had to compile and link the massive QPW code base successfully.

The technical risk of the QPW project was immense. The object model was untried and might not have worked for a spreadsheet. The user interface (UI) was new (for Windows programs at least). No one knew if the C++ compiler could generate fast enough code. As it turned out, the program worked. It was fast, it was close in feature set to Lotus 123 and Excel, and the "right-click for properties" user design was reasonably understandable.

At one point, it was hoped that QPW and Paradox for Windows would be able to share a common object model. That proved impossible despite serious thought and design efforts.

QPW was finally released in September 1992. The Quattro Pro marketing team had chosen to bundle both Quattro Pro for DOS and Quattro Pro for Windows in the same box labeled "WIN-DOS" at a price of $495. Customers and reviewers expecting a pure Windows application responded with confusion and outrage, believing the product was merely a DOS application with windowing capabilities. Shortly thereafter QPW was re-packaged by itself and priced $129, receiving accolades for Borland's long-delayed pure Windows spreadsheet and its popular price.

Eventually it sold well (after the price was slashed to just $49 a copy). Work was started immediately on a new version with a brand new team of engineers led by Joe Ammirato; including Bret Gillis and Peter Weyzen. Borland purchased DataPivot from Brio Technology to add a new feature to the program. Colin Glassey came from Brio to help with the integration of that technology.

After a year and the merging of the old team and the new team, QPW 5 was released (the reason for the jump in version number had to do with keeping up with the DOS version as well as it looked good). QPW 5 sold well also, though the Microsoft Excel + Word combination was gaining steam.

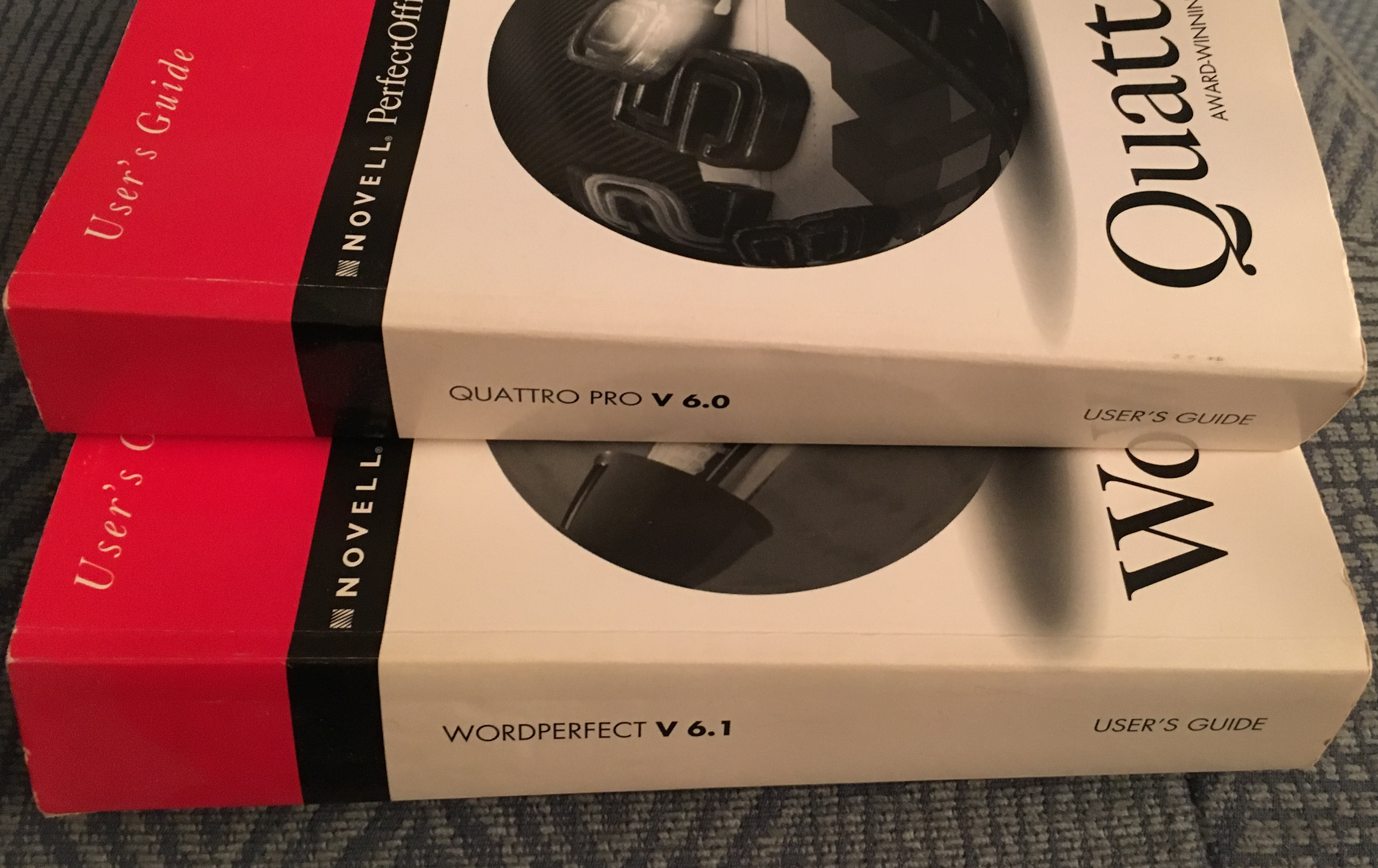
Quattro Pro 6 User's Guide, from the Novell era

Work then started on version 6 (now with Steven Boye as project lead). Midway through the development of version 6 a strategic decision to work closely with the WordPerfect word processor was made. It was a direct attempt to push back at the Microsoft Office one-two punch of Microsoft Word and Microsoft Excel. The other big issue with Version 6 was the advent of Windows 95. This was a significant modification to the Windows operating system with a major change to user interface guidelines.

In an odd set of events, Novell purchased both WordPerfect Corporation and the Quattro Pro code base and team of engineers from Borland. Novell was going to try to be a real competitor to Microsoft. Although Version 6 was released and some effort was made to unify the user interface between WordPerfect and QPW, the effort was far from complete.

In another lawsuit, Novell claims that Microsoft had "deliberately targeted and destroyed" its WordPerfect and QuattroPro programs to protect its Windows operating system monopoly. The US Supreme Court refused to halt the antitrust lawsuit in March 2008.

== Novell's exit ==
The release of Windows 95 in August 1995 was the beginning of the end for Novell and its plans to compete with Microsoft. Not only did Microsoft release a new operating system, but Microsoft also released new versions of Word and Excel to accompany it. Sales of Novell PerfectOffice (and Lotus applications as well) sank to almost nothing while sales of the Microsoft products were huge. Within three months, Novell announced they were going to sell their applications to someone (eventually that proved to be Corel). By mid-1996, Microsoft had 95% of the market for business applications. As of 2005, Microsoft still dominates the market for Windows business application software, although Quattro Pro and WordPerfect, which pre-dated the MS Office 4.2 suite, are still both updated and sold.

== File formats ==
Quattro Pro file formats use various filename extensions, including WB1, WB2, WB3, wq1 and wq2; some of these (WB2, wq1, and wq2) may open in the desktop applications of Collabora Online, LibreOffice or Apache OpenOffice and then be saved into the OpenDocument format or other file formats, Microsoft dropped support for Quattro Pro file formats after Office 2007.

== Reception ==
A 1990 American Institute of Certified Public Accountants member survey found that 10% of respondents used Quattro as their spreadsheet, second to 1-2-3 (62%) and ahead of Microsoft Multiplan (7%). 4% of respondents used it as their database, and 11% for graphics.

== Version history ==
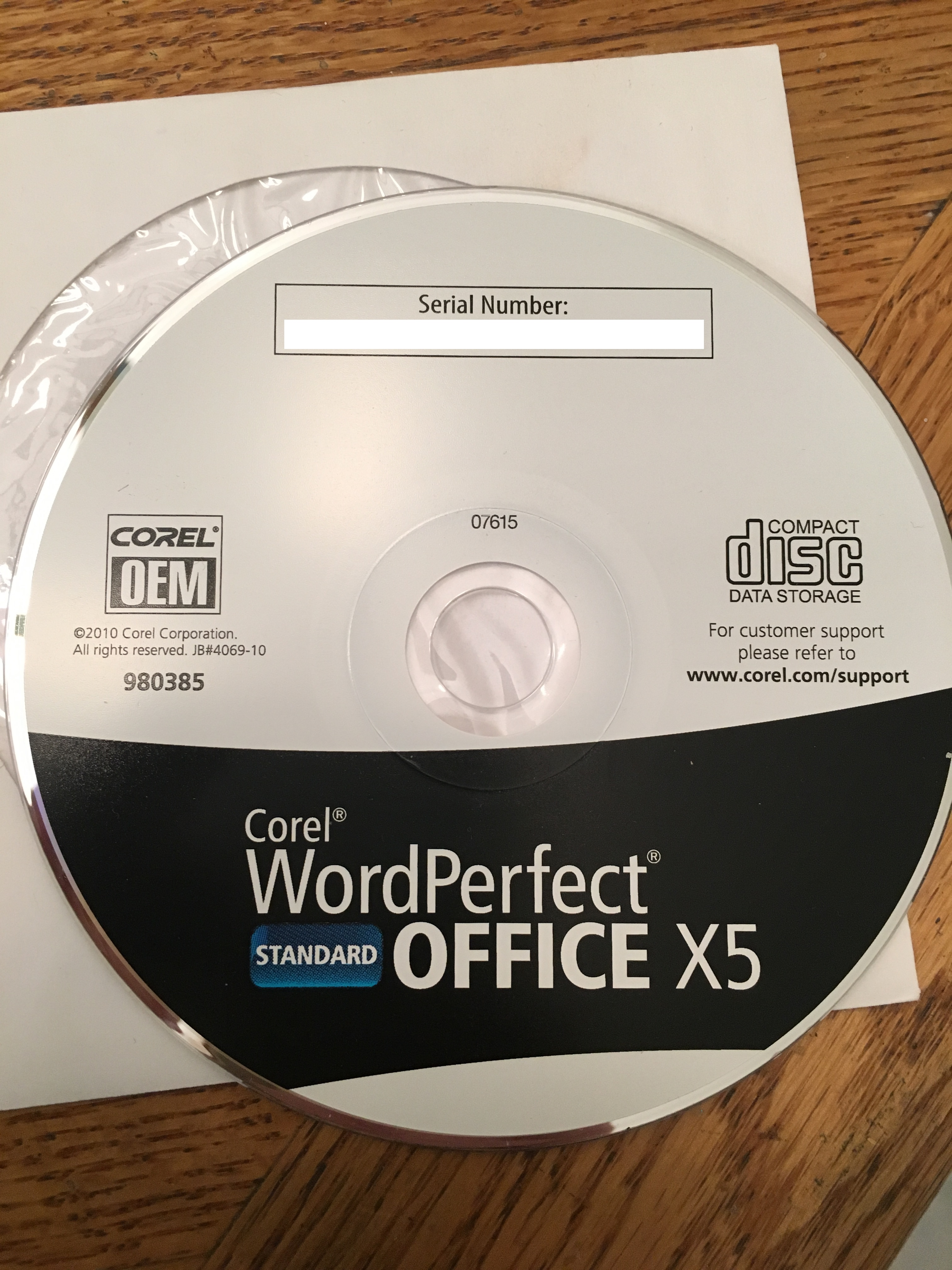
Corel WordPerfect Office X5 installation CD, containing Quattro Pro X5

- 1989: Quattro Pro 1.0
- 1991: Quattro Pro 2.0
- 1991: Quattro Pro 3.0 for DOS
- 1992: Quattro Pro 4.0 for DOS
- 1992: Quattro Pro for Windows 1.0 (also in Borland Office for Windows (1993))
- 1993: Quattro Pro for Windows 5.0 (also in Borland Office 2.0 for Windows)
- 1994: Quattro Pro for Windows 6.0 (part of Novell PerfectOffice 3.0)
- 1996: Quattro Pro 7 (part of Corel WordPerfect Suite 7)
- 1998: Quattro Pro 8 (part of Corel WordPerfect Suite 8)
- 2000: Quattro Pro 9 (part of Corel WordPerfect Office 2000)
- 2002: Quattro Pro 10 (part of Corel WordPerfect Office 2002)
- 2003: Quattro Pro 11 (part of Corel WordPerfect Office 11)
- 2004: Quattro Pro 12 (part of Corel WordPerfect Office 12)
- 2006: Quattro Pro X3 (part of Corel WordPerfect Office X3)
- 2008: Quattro Pro X4 (part of Corel WordPerfect Office X4)
- 2010: Quattro Pro X5 (part of Corel WordPerfect Office X5)
- 2012: Quattro Pro X6 (part of Corel WordPerfect Office X6)
- 2014: Quattro Pro X7 (part of Corel WordPerfect Office X7)
- 2016: Quattro Pro X8 (part of Corel WordPerfect Office X8)
- 2018: Quattro Pro X9 (part of Corel WordPerfect Office X9)
- 2020: Quattro Pro 2020 (part of Corel WordPerfect Office 2020)

== See also ==
- More history of Surpass (pre-Quattro Pro code base)
- Comparison of spreadsheet software
- Office Open XML software
