= NetCaptor =

Internet Explorer program, 1997 to 2005

- Developer: Stilesoft inc.
- Stable release: 7.5.4 / February 18, 2005; 21 years ago
- Operating system: Windows
- Type: Web browser
- Website: Archived 2010-04-03 at the Wayback Machine

NetCaptor was an Internet Explorer shell that was in development from 1997 to 2005. It used the Trident layout engine of Internet Explorer in conjunction with additional programmed features to create an alternate browsing experience with a tab-based interface and an expanded feature set. It was an adware/shareware program, but its developer released a registration key for free public use once development ceased.

== Features ==
The main features are, as of the last released version, 7.5.4:

- Tab-based browsing interface
- QuickSearch: Allows you to perform search engine queries directly from the address bar. For example, to search for "testing" on Google, you would simply type "g testing" into any tab's address bar.
- Aliases: Like QuickSearch, except that they do not require you to enter a search term as a parameter. For example, typing "g" would take you to the Google front page. Can be used to replace Favorites.
- Automatic data wiper: Allows you to clear usage data, temporary internet files, cookies, and more whenever NetCaptor is closed. Supports several different file wiping methods.
- CaptorGroups: Essentially, grouped Favorites that can be opened all at once. You could, for example, have several news sites in one single CaptorGroup, then use that group to open all the sites the next time you want to look at news.
- PopupCaptor: Pop-up blocking feature capable of blocking unrequested popups, or filtering them based on URL matches (i.e. all popups from a certain website only).
- URL Blocking: Allows you to prevent anything coming from the specified URL from loading. For example, you can prevent the loading of all data (images, sound, ads, etc.) sent from a certain website.
- Quick access to settings: Quick access to things like security settings or cookies. You can also quickly enable or disable functions like JavaScript or ActiveX.
- Quick access to useful websites: Quickly translate the current page using translation engines like BabelFish, access an archived copy of the website using the Internet Archive, look up Whois information for the site, or perform other user-defined tasks.

After development stopped, one of NetCaptor's most valued features—a side bar and panel that listed search results—also ceased to function. Most other features continue to work. Its later releases were not Trident-based Internet Explorer shells but resembled Internet Explorer 6 in a number of ways, except for the tabbed browsing feature. Some people ceased to use "bare" Internet Explorer in favor of NetCaptor because Internet Explorer 6 lacked tabbed browsing natively, which led to Microsoft implementing this feature in the next release, Internet Explorer 7.

== History and development ==
NetCaptor's development began under the name SimulBrowse in 1997. SimulBrowse was renamed Netcaptor because the developer didn't like the name. Some of the browser's features were original, while others were inspired by similar products. According to a statement from developer Adam Stiles, NetCaptor was one of the first browsers to feature a tabbed browsing interface; while similarities were found in other browsers of the era (such as Booklink's Internetworks or Opera), NetCaptor's tabs were closest in form and function to the tabs found in modern browsers.

NetCaptor was a closed-source program started and maintained by Adam Stiles.

The last released version, 7.5.4, was made available on February 18, 2005. On a post dated January 8, 2008, Stiles officially declared that "NetCaptor is Dead" after 10 years, and "What a ride it's been". Stiles recommended that users switch to the Mozilla Firefox or Safari web browsers. He simultaneously released a free registration key for anyone still wishing to use NetCaptor, but due to the browser's tendency to phone home to check registration key validity and the dissolution of the website, the key no longer functions:

BBLdOxhx2bovHIQ0pVZjaiTWmAuEjmPOUM3tsFTcNzb4kjXdiq0
P+wsLJp4BBuNKtYYyKyAuRRgp8h=REQ+7f2h3PfFIoZFH91P5On
6eppScyJ560Xjr1z9dQDcLj43LACA496IEz+jNAVeEOT7RfWph5
7tCk6ajYmLEFc5ODjy 

There is no legally provided workaround or modification available.

== See also ==
- Internet Explorer shell
- Internet Explorer
