= Inukshuk Wireless =

Internet service provider in Canada

Inukshuk Wireless Inc.
- Type: private partnership
- Founded: 2005 (partnership) as Inukshuk Wireless; 1999 (predecessor) as Inukshuk Internet
- Headquarters: Montreal, Quebec, Canada
- Area served: Canada: Newfoundland and Labrador, Nova Scotia, Eastern Ontario and Outaouais, Prince Edward Island, New Brunswick, Quebec, Ontario, Alberta, British Columbia, and the Yukon
- Parent: BCE Inc. Rogers Communications
- Website: inukshuk.ca (defunct)

Inukshuk Wireless Inc. is a joint venture of BCE Inc. and Rogers Communications, created in 2005 to establish a Canada-wide network for wireless Internet connectivity in 45 major cities and over 120 rural communities, throughout the ten Industry Canada licensed areas. Bell and Rogers separately market the service to their customers as Portable Internet, although Bell also offers a Rural Internet service.

== History ==
Inukshuk Internet, a predecessor to Inukshuk Wireless, was originally formed in 1999. Inukshuk was acquired by Microcell in 2001, which was acquired by Rogers in 2004. The spectrum and technology was merged into the joint venture with Bell in 2005.

Until November 7, 2008, Bell Internet Portable was referred to as Sympatico High Speed Unplugged or Bell WiMAX Unplugged. Likewise, Bell Internet Rural was referred to as Bell WiMAX In-home.

Bell had announced termination of its Portable Internet service on February 14, 2012. Rogers had announced termination of its Portable Internet service on March 1, 2012.

The 30 Mhz slice of 2300 Mhz spectrum was transferred to Orion Wireless Partnership, for a fixed wireless LTE national network.

== Network ==
The Inukshuk network was built using pre-WiMAX technology provided by Expedience solution from Motorola, now Nexpedience Networks.

=== Coverage ===
The network provides connectivity to 45 major cities and more than 120 rural communities throughout the ten Industry Canada licensed areas.

Activation, however, is only available in certain rural regions. Bell only allowed customers in the following regions of the province of Ontario to subscribe to Portable or Rural Internet:

- Bruce County
- Dawn-Euphemia
- Dufferin County
- Laurentian Valley
- Middlesex County
- Simcoe County
- South Glengarry

== Services ==
=== Wireless Internet ===
Monthly bandwidth limits for customers were not tightly enforced, and simply existed to protect against network abuse. Bell's Rural ("In-home") service used the same technology as the portable ("Unplugged") product, except the modem itself was mounted to a user's home in the direction of the tower it would have connected to. Hence, it was not designed to be portable.

Service	Speeds		Monthly bandwidth limits
Service	Download	Upload	Monthly bandwidth limits
Portable Internet	3 Mbit/s	384 kbit/s	30 GB
Rural Internet (Note: This service was exclusive to Bell.)	2 Mbit/s	256 kbit/s	10 GB
Portable Internet Lite (Note: Information about this service was previously available on Rogers' website, but has since been removed.)	512 kbit/s	128 kbit/s	10 GB

Bell also offered "Unplugged" service for businesses.

=== Peer-to-peer throttling ===
Inukshuk Wireless throttled peer-to-peer (P2P) traffic on its network during peak times of the day.

For Bell customers, downloads and uploads were throttled to 512 kbit/s from 16h30 to 17h59 EST, then to 256 kbit/s from 18h00 to 23h59 EST, and again to 512 kbit/s from 0h00 to 1h00 EST every day. No throttling occurred from 1h00 to 16h30.
